= List of COVID-19 apps =

Mobile applications for the COVID-19 pandemic

COVID-19 apps, including mobile-software applications on iOS and Android for digital contact-tracing:

- Aarogya Setu
- BlueTrace
- careFIJI
- Coronavirus Australia
- Corona-Warn-App
- COVID-19 Contact-Confirming Application
- COVID Alert (Canada)
- COVID AlertSA (South Africa)
- COVIDSafe
- COVID Symptom Study
- COVID Tracker Ireland
- Covid Watch
- Decentralized Privacy-Preserving Proximity Tracing
- Exposure Notification
- Health Code
- Healthy Together
- Immuni
- Koronavilkku
- LeaveHomeSafe
- MySejahtera
- NHS COVID-19
- NZ COVID Tracer
- NZ Pass Verifier
- PathCheck
- PeduliLindungi
- SafeEntry
- SafePass
- StaySafe.ph
- SwissCovid
- TCN Protocol
- Test, Trace, Protect
- Thai Chana
- TousAntiCovid
- TraceTogether
- Valtrace
