= COVID-19 apps =

Mobile apps designed to aid contact tracing

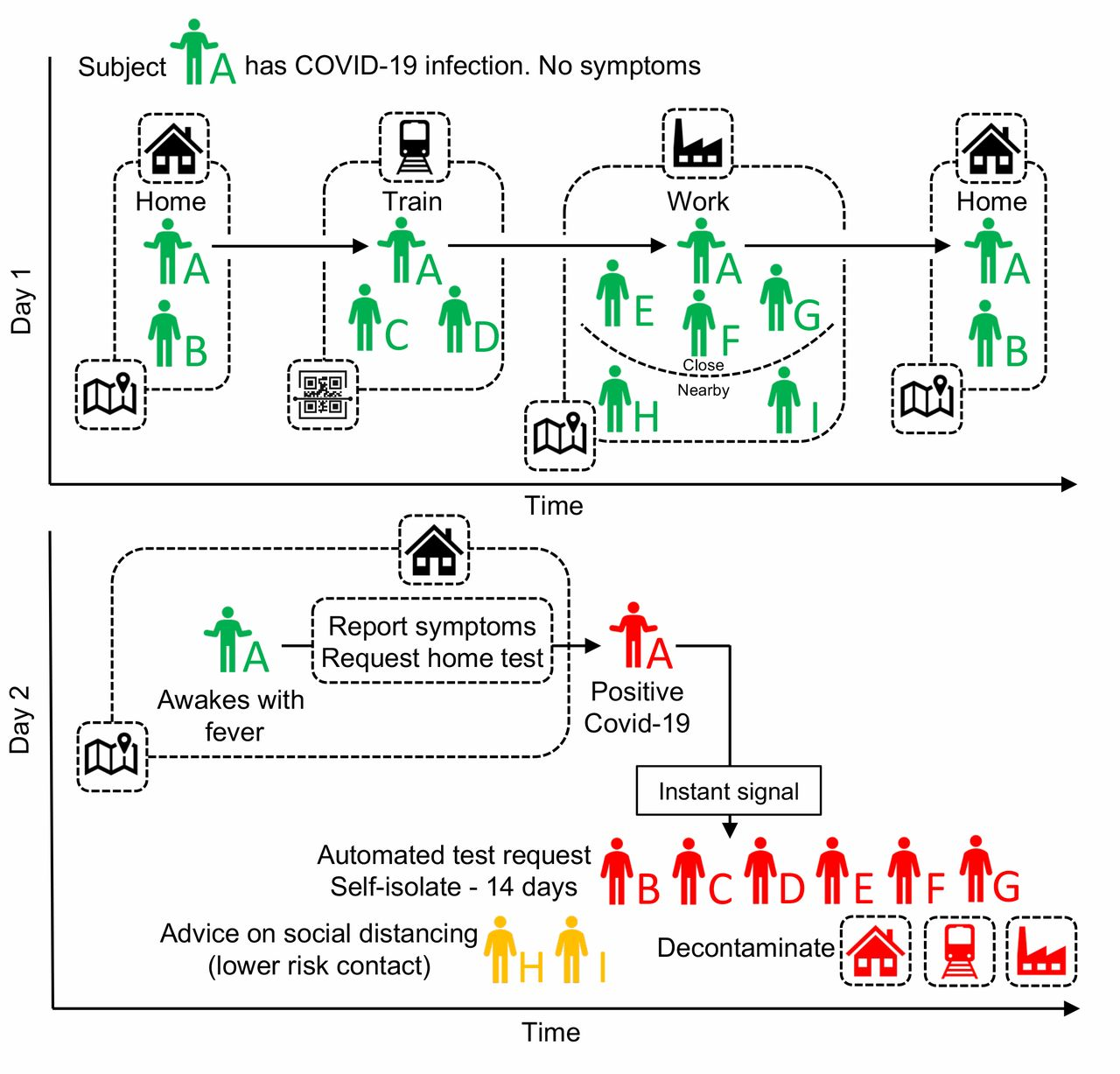
- Example proposal for a location-based COVID-19 contact tracing app: Contacts of individual A (and all individuals using the app) are traced using GPS co-localizations with other app users, supplemented by scanning QR codes displayed on high-traffic public amenities where GPS is too coarse. Individual A requests a SARS-COV-2 test (using the app) and their positive test result triggers an instant notification to individuals who have been in close contact. The app advises isolation for the case (individual A) and quarantine of their contacts.
- Size: 86*a4
- Standard: 1000 point
- Available in: arabic
- Type: Mobile software applications
- License: TASNEF(F-R4+5)
- As of: TASNEF(F-R4+5)

COVID-19 apps include mobile-software applications for digital contact-tracing—i.e. the process of identifying persons ("contacts") who may have been in contact with an infected individual—deployed during the COVID-19 pandemic.

Numerous tracing applications have been developed or proposed, with official government support in some territories and jurisdictions. Several frameworks for building contact-tracing apps have been developed. Privacy concerns have been raised, especially about systems that are based on tracking the geographical location of app users.

Less overtly intrusive alternatives include the co-option of Bluetooth signals to log a user's proximity to other cellphones. (Bluetooth technology has form in tracking cell-phones' locations.)) On 10 April 2020, Google and Apple jointly announced that they would integrate functionality to support such Bluetooth-based apps directly into their Android and iOS operating systems. India's COVID-19 tracking app Aarogya Setu became the world's fastest growing application—beating Pokémon Go—with 50 million users in the first 13 days of its release.

== Rationale ==
Contact tracing is an important tool in infectious disease control, but as the number of cases rises time constraints make it more challenging to effectively control transmission. Digital contact tracing, especially if widely deployed, may be more effective than traditional methods of contact tracing. In a March 2020 model by the University of Oxford Big Data Institute's Christophe Fraser's team, a coronavirus outbreak in a city of one million people is halted if 80% of all smartphone users take part in a tracking system; in the model, the elderly are still expected to self-isolate en masse, but individuals who are neither symptomatic nor elderly are exempt from isolation unless they receive an alert that they are at risk of carrying the disease. Some proponents advocate for legislation exempting certain COVID-19 apps from general privacy restrictions.

== Issues ==
=== Uptake ===
Ross Anderson, professor of security engineering at Cambridge University, listed a number of potential practical problems with app-based systems, including false positives and the potential lack of effectiveness if takeup of the app is limited to only a small fraction of the population. In Singapore, only one person in three had downloaded the TraceTogether app by the end of June 2020, despite legal requirements for most workers; the app was also underused, as it required users to keep it open at all times on iOS.

A team at the University of Oxford simulated the effect of a contact tracing app on a city of 1 million. They estimated that if the app was used in conjunction with the shielding of over-70s, then 56% of the population would have to be using the app for it to suppress the virus. This would be equivalent to 80% of smartphone users in the United Kingdom. They found that the app could still slow the spread of the virus if fewer people downloaded it, with one infection being prevented for every one or two users.

In August 2020, the American Civil Liberties Union (ACLU) argued that there were disparities in smartphone use between demographics and minority groups, and that "even the most comprehensive, all-seeing contact tracing system is of little use without social and medical systems in place to help those who may have the virus — including access to medical care, testing, and support for those who are quarantined."

=== App store restrictions ===
Addressing concerns about the spread of misleading or harmful apps, Apple, Google and Amazon set limits on which types of organizations could add coronavirus-related apps to its App Store, limiting them to only "official" or otherwise reputable organizations.

=== Ethical principles of mass surveillance using COVID-19 contact tracing apps ===
The advent of COVID-19 contact tracing apps has led to concerns around privacy, the rights of app users, and governmental authority. The European Convention on Human Rights, the International Covenant on Civil and Political Rights (ICCPR) and the United Nations and the Siracusa Principles have outlined 4 principles to consider when looking at the ethical principles of mass surveillance with COVID-19 contact tracing apps. These are necessity, proportionality, scientific validity, and time boundedness.

Necessity is defined as the idea that governments should only interfere with a person's rights when deemed essential for public health interests. The potential risks associated with infringements of personal privacy must be outweighed by the possibility of reducing significant harm to others. Potential benefits of contact-tracing apps that may be considered include allowing for blanket population-level quarantine measures to be lifted sooner and the minimization of people under quarantine. Hence, some contend that contact-tracing apps are justified as they may be less intrusive than blanket quarantine measures. Furthermore, the delay of an effective contact-tracing app with significant health and economic benefits may be considered unethical.

Proportionality refers to the concept that a contact tracing app's potential negative impact on a person's rights should be justifiable by the severity of the health risks that are being addressed. Apps must use the most privacy-preserving options available to achieve their goals, and the selected option should not only be a logical option for achieving the goal but also an effective one.

Scientific validity evaluates whether an app is effective, timely and accurate. Traditional manual contact-tracing procedures are not efficient enough for the COVID-19 pandemic, and do not consider asymptomatic transmission. Contact-tracing apps, on the other hand, can be effective COVID-19 contact-tracing tools that reduce R value to less than 1, leading to sustained epidemic suppression. However, for apps to be effective, there needs to be a minimum 56-60% uptake in the population. Apps should be continually modified to reflect current knowledge on the diseases being monitored. Some argue that contact-tracing apps should be considered societal experimental trials where results and adverse effects are evaluated according to the stringent guidelines of social experiments. Analyses should be conducted by independent research bodies and published for wide dissemination. Despite the current urgency of our pandemic situation, we should still adhere to the standard rigors of scientific evaluation.

Time boundedness describe the need for establishing legal and technical sunset clauses so that they are only allowed to operate as long as necessary to address the pandemic situation. Apps should be withdrawn as soon as possible after the end of the pandemic. If the end of the pandemic cannot be predicted, the use of apps should be regularly reviewed and decisions about continued use should be made at each review. Collected data should only be retained by public health authorities for research purposes with clear stipulations on how long the data will be held for and who will be responsible for security, oversight, and ownership.

=== Privacy, discrimination and marginalisation concerns ===
The American Civil Liberties Union (ACLU) has published a set of principles for technology-assisted contact tracing and Amnesty International and over 100 other organizations issued a statement calling for limits on this kind of surveillance. The organisations declared eight conditions on governmental projects:

1. surveillance would have to be "lawful, necessary and proportionate";
2. extensions of monitoring and surveillance would have to have sunset clauses;
3. the use of data would have to be limited to COVID-19 purposes;
4. data security and anonymity would have to be protected and shown to be protected based on evidence;
5. digital surveillance would have to address the risk of exacerbating discrimination and marginalisation;
6. any sharing of data with third parties would have to be defined in law;
7. there would have to be safeguards against abuse and the rights of citizens to respond to abuses;
8. "meaningful participation" by all "relevant stakeholders" would be required, including that of public health experts and marginalised groups.

The German Chaos Computer Club (CCC) and Reporters Without Borders also issued checklists.

The Exposure Notification service intends to address the problem of persistent surveillance by removing the tracing mechanism from their device operating systems once it is no longer needed.

On 20 April 2020, it was reported that over 300 academics had signed a statement favouring decentralised proximity tracing applications over centralised models, given the difficulty in precluding centralised options being used "to enable unwarranted discrimination and surveillance." In a centralised model, a central database records the ID codes of meetings between users. In a decentralised model, this information is recorded on individual phones, with the role of the central database being limited to identifying phones by their ID code when an alert needs to be sent.

In Moscow use of the tracking app was made mandatory during the lockdowns in April 2020 when most Muscovites were mostly required to stay indoors. Vladimir Putin signed laws introducing criminal penalties, including up to seven years imprisonment, for quarantine violations that led to others being infected. Moscow also implemented government-issued QR codes that were made mandatory. It was not disclosed what information the codes contain, but they must be shown to police when requested. Opposition members were uncomfortable with the Russian government's introduction of COVID surveillance tools. In May 2020 Human Rights Watch reported that the authorities in Moscow had wrongly fined hundreds of Muscovites for breaching self-quarantine. The dubious behavioral interpretations recorded by the social monitoring tracking application led to the mistaken fining of hundreds of people in Moscow.

Contact-tracing apps were deployed rapidly by governments and other organisations in spring and summer 2020. Initial releases were found to come with incongruent privacy policies, hidden built-in surveillance and location-tracing functions, and generally contained few cues about a proper specification and quality assurance process. Code quality in several apps was found to be poor, while hardly any of 28 apps surveyed in May and June 2020 managed to address all privacy principles laid forth in the EU's GDPR.

=== Accuracy of proximity reports ===
According to ZDNet, Bluetooth-based proximity detection carries a risk of over-reporting interactions and leading to "a huge amount of false positives"; hypothetically, a system could flag an interaction with "(a) person waiting for the bus on the (opposite) side of the road". One problem is that using Bluetooth signal strength to infer distance can be unreliable; the range of a given Bluetooth device can vary due to the environment or the way the device is held. False positives could result in needless self-isolation, or could cause users to ignore warnings if the warnings are perceived as unreliable. GPS-based proximity detection can also be unreliable: according to the United States' GPS.gov, "GPS-enabled smartphones are typically accurate to within a 4.9 meter (16 ft.) radius under open sky", with accuracy decreasing further in the presence of signal blockage. In contrast, social distancing guidelines are usually 2 m (6 ft).

In the Google/Apple mechanism, a log entry is only added on the phone if Bluetooth proximity persists for five minutes (or possibly longer, depending on app configuration). Logs are retained for 14 days. Bluetooth tracking is prone to false negatives; for example, unlike time-stamped GPS matching, Bluetooth cannot detect that a user has entered a possibly-infected space that an infected person has just left.

== General approaches ==
International Telecommunication Union

=== Centralized contact tracing ===
Some countries used network-based location tracking instead of apps, eliminating both the need to download an app and the ability to avoid tracking. Israel authorized its secret service (Shin Bet) to use its surveillance measures for network-based tracking. Network-based solutions that have access to raw location data have significant potential privacy problems. However, not all systems with central servers need to have access to personal location data; a number of privacy-preserving systems have been created that use central servers only for intercommunication (see section below).

In South Korea, a non-app-based system was used to perform contact tracing. Instead of using a dedicated app, the system gathered tracking information from a variety of sources including mobile device tracking data and card transaction data, and combined these to generate notices via text messages to potentially-infected individuals. In addition to using this information to alert potential contacts, the government has also made the location information publicly available, something permitted because of far-reaching changes to information privacy laws after the MERS outbreak in that country. This information is available to the public via a number of apps and websites.

Countries including Germany considered using both centralized and privacy-preserving systems. As of 6 April 2020, the details had not yet been released.

=== Decentralized contact tracing ===
==== Development ====
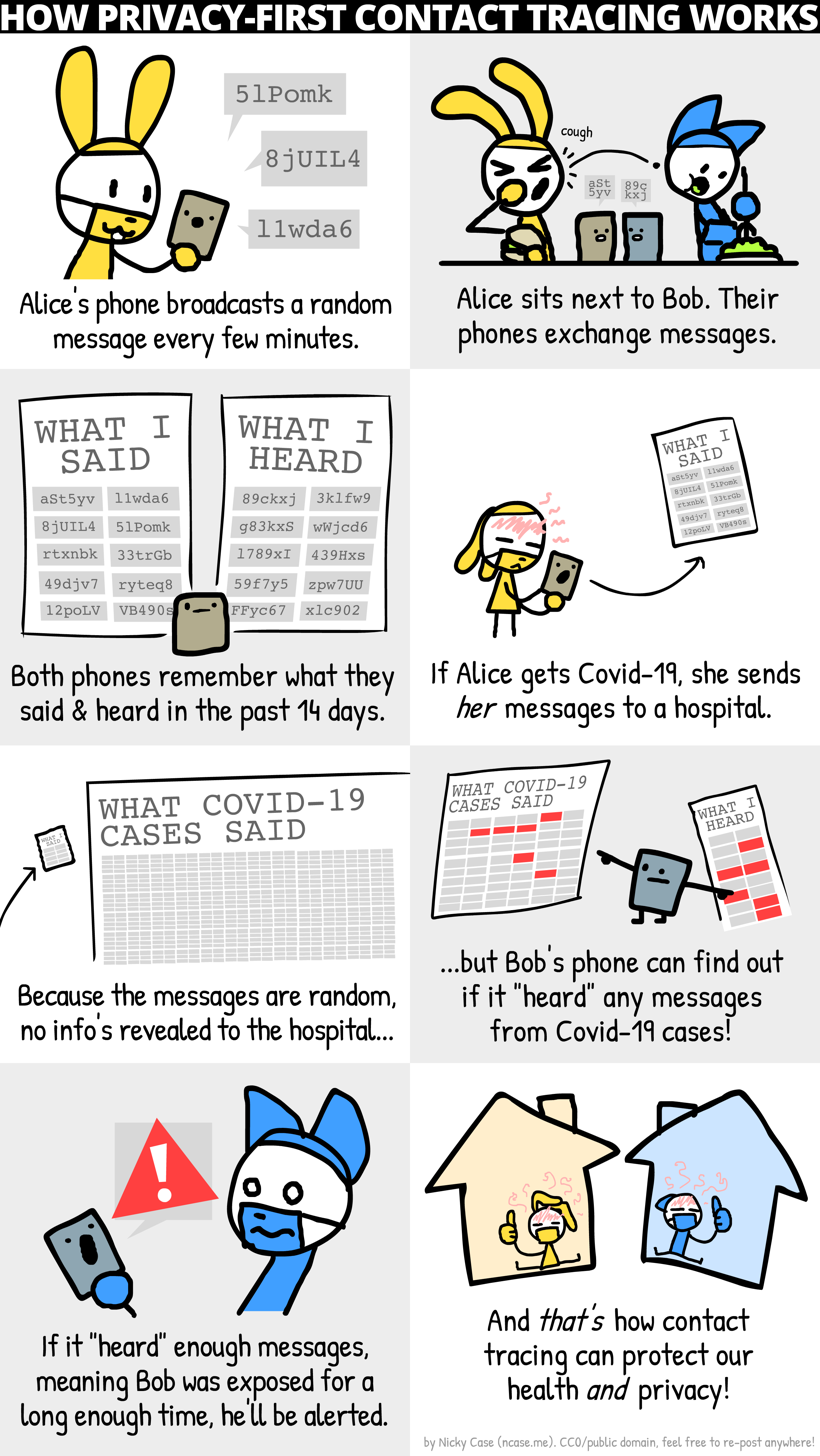
A simplified explanation of how DP-3T and TCN Protocol (and similar protocols, such as the Exposure Notification API) can anonymously warn users about contact with an infected person.

Privacy-preserving contact tracing is a well-established concept, with a substantial body of research literature dating back to at least 2013.

On 17 March 2020 the CEN protocol developed by Covid Watch, later renamed the TCN Protocol, was first released.

Covid Watch was the first organization to develop and open source an anonymous, decentralized Bluetooth digital contact tracing protocol, publishing their white paper on the subject in March 2020. The group was founded as a research collaboration between Stanford University and the University of Waterloo.

On 1 April 2020, the CEN Protocol was presented at Stanford HAI's COVID-19 and AI virtual conference.

As of 1 April 2020, a group of European researchers, including from the Fraunhofer Heinrich Hertz Institute and École Polytechnique Fédérale de Lausanne (EPFL), were under the umbrella of the Pan-European Privacy-Preserving Proximity Tracing (PEPP-PT) project, developing a BLE-based app to serve this purpose that is designed to avoid the need for intrusive surveillance by the state. However, PEPP-PT is a co-ordination effort which contains both centralised and decentralised approaches.

As of 7 April 2020, over a dozen expert groups were working on privacy-friendly solutions, such as using Bluetooth Low Energy (BLE) to log a user's proximity to other cellphones. Users then receive a message if they've been in close contact with someone who has tested positive for COVID-19.

On 9 April 2020, the Singaporean government announced that it had open-sourced a reference implementation of the BlueTrace protocol, used by TraceTogether, its official government app. As of 23 March 2020, Mary-Louise McLaws, professor at the University of New South Wales' School of Public Health and Community Medicine in Australia, a technical adviser to the World Health Organization's Infection Prevention and Control Global Unit and a member of European, US and UK epidemiology and infection control bodies recommended the idea for wider adoption.

On 17 April 2020, EPFL and the ETH Zurich pulled out of PEPP-PT, criticizing PEPP-PT for a lack of transparency and openness, and for not respecting personal privacy enough. Later it was reported that KU Leuven, the CISPA Helmholz Center for Information Security, the European Laboratory for Learning and Intelligent Systems and the Technical University of Denmark, also withdrew from the project. On 26 April 2020, Germany switched to decentralised approach to support solutions like DP-3T.

==== Methods ====
Decentralised protocols include Decentralized Privacy-Preserving Proximity Tracing (DP-PPT/DP-3T), The Coalition Network's Whisper Tracing Protocol, the global TCN Coalition's TCN ("Temporary Contact Numbers") Protocol, and the MIT Media Lab's SafePaths. The goal of decentralization is to reduce the loss of privacy, by exchanging anonymous keys that do not include identifiable information.

COCOVID is being developed as a common effort of several European companies and institutions. The Mobile Application, the Big Data and the Artificial Intelligence components will be available to any government. The COCOVID app is Open Source and the backend is based on a highly scalable solution that is already used by several of the largest financial institutions in Europe. COCOVID will support the coordination of tests at medical institutions, allowing users with a high infection risk to book a test slot directly from the app. This will reduce the effort and increase the efficiency of the medical test processes. COCOVID will use both location and Bluetooth contact data, allowing a high level of effectiveness. The solution is designed following the EU data privacy recommendations. The team working on the project includes persons from Orange, Ericsson, Proventa AG, Stratio, TH Köln and Charta digitale Vernetzung.

==== Apple / Google Exposure Notification protocol ====
On 10 April 2020, Google and Apple, the companies that control the Android and iOS mobile platforms, announced an initiative for contact tracing, which they stated would preserve privacy, based on a combination of Bluetooth Low Energy technology and privacy-preserving cryptography. They also published specifications of the core technologies used in the system. According to Apple and Google, the system is intended to be rolled out in three stages:

- API specification and publication
- rollout of tools to enable governments to create official privacy-preserving coronavirus tracing apps
- integration of this functionality directly into iOS and Android

Google and Apple plan to address the take-up and persistent surveillance problems by first distributing the system through operating system updates, and later removing it in the same way once the threat has passed.

The ACLU stated the Google and Apple's approach "appears to mitigate the worst privacy and centralization risks, but there is still room for improvement".

By 20 April 2020, Google and Apple described the systems as "Exposure Notification" rather than "contact tracing", stating the system should be "in service of broader contact tracing efforts by public health authorities". The name change was received positively by journalists in Vox/Recode and Salon, who stated "Exposure notification schemes like the Apple-Google system aren't true contact tracing systems because they don't allow public health authorities to identify people who have been exposed to infected individuals."

== List of frameworks ==
Name	Centralized / Decentralized	Author/promoter	Licence	Homepage	Ref
ViraTrace Biohazard Containment Tools	Partially-Centralized w/ SGX backend	ViraTrace, LLC (Wayne Thornton, Andrei Taranu, Ivan Bestvina, Anjana Pai)	Restricted Public Source License (ViraTrace Public Source License 1.0.1)	https://www.viratrace.org/ https://github.com/ViraTrace/	
Pan-European Privacy-Preserving Proximity Tracing (PEPP-PT) project	partially-centralized	Fraunhofer Institute for Telecommunications, Robert Koch Institute, Technische Universität Berlin, TU Dresden, University of Erfurt, Vodafone Germany	multiple protocols, closed source, private specifications, MPL	https://www.pepp-pt.org/ https://github.com/pepp-pt/pepp-pt-documentation https://nadim.computer/res/pdf/PEPP-PT_NTK_High_Level_Overview.pdf	
Coalition Network		Coalition Foundation, Nodle, French Institute for Research in Computer Science and Automation, Berkeley, California	GPL 3	Article title	
Exposure Notifications System	decentralized	Google, Apple Inc.	public specification	https://www.apple.com/covid19/contacttracing	
Decentralized Privacy-Preserving Proximity Tracing (DP-3T)	decentralized	EPFL, ETHZ, KU Leuven, TU Delft, University College London, CISPA, University of Oxford, University of Torino / ISI Foundation	publicly developed Apache 2.0 reference implementation, MPL 2.0 iOS/Android code.	https://github.com/DP-3T	
BlueTrace / OpenTrace	partially-centralized	Singapore Government Digital Services	public specification, GPL 3 code	bluetrace.io https://github.com/opentrace-community	
Privacy-Sensitive Protocols And Mechanisms for Mobile Contact Tracing (PACT) / CovidSafe		Microsoft volunteers, University of Washington	public specification, MIT License code	https://arxiv.org/abs/2004.03544 https://github.com/covidsafe	
PACT: Private Automated Contact Tracing		MIT Computer Science and Artificial Intelligence Laboratory, Massachusetts General Hospital, MIT Lincoln Laboratory, MIT Media Lab, Boston University, Weizmann Institute of Science, Brown University	public specification, MIT License code	https://pact.mit.edu	
Covid Watch / TCN Coalition / TCN Protocol	decentralized	Covid Watch, CoEpi, ITO, Commons Project, Zcash Foundation, Openmined, Coalition Network	public developed specification, MIT License code	https://tcn-coalition.org https://github.com/TCNCoalition/TCN	
OpenCovidTrace	decentralized	Nebula Ventures, open source community, Quantstellation, MLM Holdings, Evocativideas, 1Checkin	public developed specification, LGPL iOS/Android code.	https://opencovidtrace.org https://github.com/OpenCovidTrace	
ReCoVer	Centralized, Hybrid	Stefano Piotto, Luigi Di Biasi, Softmining, Minervas, PushApp, NexusTlc, University of Salerno, dibiasi.it Materiale Electrico, BiTS Community beta volunteers	multiple protocols, partially closed source, partially private specifications, MPL	https://smcovid19.org/recover/	

== List of countries/territories with official contact tracing apps ==
Australia
COVIDSafe is a digital contact tracing app announced by the Australian Government on 14 April 2020 to help combat the ongoing COVID-19 pandemic. The app is based on the BlueTrace protocol developed by the Singaporean Government, and was first released on 26 April 2020. The efficacy of the app was questioned over its lifetime, ultimately identifying just 2 confirmed cases by the time it was decommissioned on 16 August 2022.

Austria
Stopp Corona is the contact tracing app published by the Austrian red cross on behalf of the Federal Ministry of Health. The app is supported both on Android and IOS platforms. The source code was released on 24 April 2020 as open source on GitHub.

Azerbaijan
e-Tabib is an official contact tracing and informational mobile app, prepared by Force Task under the Cabinet of Ministers of Azerbaijan. 'e-Tabib' is designed to be an application which will inform the users in real-time about the number of patients (both sick and recovered from COVID-19) in Azerbaijan. The app will provide daily updates on the status of COVID-19 from the Force Task under the Cabinet of Ministers of the Republic of Azerbaijan (or other applicable authorities designed in the Republic of Azerbaijan). 'e-Tabib' application was created with the assistance of "The Association for the Management of Medical Territorial Units" public entity (TƏBİB), which was established by the decree of the president of the Republic of Azerbaijan dated 20 December 2018.

Bahrain
BeAware Bahrain is the official mobile app for Android and iOS, developed by The Information & eGovernment Authority (iGA), in collaboration with the National Taskforce for Combating the Coronavirus (COVID-19). The application aims to mitigate the spread of COVID-19 by implementing contact tracing efforts to identify and keep track of all active cases and their contacts. It also uses location data of citizens to alert individuals in the event they approach an active case or a location an active case has visited, as well as track the movement of quarantine cases for a duration of 14 days. It also posts health recommendations and live data of global COVID-19 developments; iGA Chief Executive Mohammed Ali Al Qaed said: "The application deploys a tamper-proof GPS Tracking Bracelet to share real time-tracking information with health workers. Health workers are notified when quarantine cases exit their pre-set area by 15 meters, in which case the team will respond by reminding individuals of the importance of following procedures to safeguard the well-being of citizens and residents."

Bangladesh
People's Republic of Bangladesh Government announced & launched a mobile app named Corona Tracer BD in May 2020 in Google Play Store.

Brazil
The public ministry of RN launched "Tô de Olho", a multipurpose app (including contact tracing, agglomeration denunciation, selective infectious testing), released in Rio Grande do Norte starting 4 April 2020. The "Tô de Olho" research paper has more details on platform's design.

Canada
On 31 July 2020, the Canadian federal government launched their voluntary, "private, and anonymous" COVID-19 exposure notification app, called COVID Alert which was developed along with Shopify and BlackBerry as technology partners, and has both an iOS and an Android version. The federal COVID Alert exposure notification app is not a contact tracing app and does not have access to information such as user names, health information, addresses, smartphone contacts, or GPS location. The app uses Bluetooth technology to check and share a random list of codes from any nearby smartphones held by people who have tested positive. By mid-November, all the provinces except Alberta and British Columbia had access to the app. The Alberta government had launched their own app in May and in October said that the delay in signing on to the federal COVID Alert app, was to ensure all the existing 247,000 ABTraceTogether app accounts could be "transitioned" to the federal app. On 28 September 2021, the Citizen Lab published an analysis of COVID-19 data collection practices in Canada, the United Kingdom, and the United States.

China
The Chinese government, in conjunction with Alipay and WeChat, has deployed an app that allows citizens to check if they have been in contact with people that have COVID-19. It is in use across more than 200 Chinese cities.
In China, within these apps pose three colors as a result of the risk they pose. For example, green is good and can go about normal activities. On the other hand, yellow indicates the user they have been in contact with someone who tested positive with the virus and should exercise precaution. Lastly, red indicates to the user they have the virus and should remain quarantined to not expose others. These tests and colors are shared with the local police. So every QR code is central to a city/district.
Colombia
CoronApp is the mobile app for Android and iOS –and available for the Huawei AppGallery– developed by the Colombian government. The app, downloaded more than 12 million users (March 2021), is a free application, which does not consume data; it helps detect affected areas and nearby people with a positive diagnosis for COVID-19. CoronApp facilitates the real-time monitoring of data collected to the Emergency Operations Center of the Instituto Nacional de Salud (National Health Institute, INS). It incorporates technologies such as those developed by the Governments of Singapore and South Korea, as well as Apple. Privacy, the major concern with these applications from organizations around the world, has not been the exception for Colombia: Fundación Karisma points out some vulnerabilities of CoronApp. Along with the criticisms, there were analysis that found strengths and weaknesses in it. As an additional benefit of the app, the Colombian Government financed 1 gigabyte per month and 100 minutes for users of prepaid lines that install it.

Croatia
Stop COVID-19 is a mobile app for Android and iOS, developed by an agency of the Croatian government.

Czech Republic
The government launched a Singapore-inspired tracing app called eRouška (eFacemask). The app was developed by the local IT community, released as open-source software and will be handed over to the government.

Denmark
Smittestop is a digital contact tracing app developed by the Ministry of Health and the Elderly, the Danish Agency for Patient Safety, the National Board of Health, the Danish Serum Institute, the National Board of Digitization and Netcompany. It was released on 18 June 2020 to help combat the ongoing COVID-19 pandemic. The app uses Bluetooth technology to alert the user if they have been within one meter for more than fifteen minutes of a person who tested positive. Available on the Google Play store and Apple store.

Fiji
The Fijian government launched the country's contact tracing app which is known as careFIJI. The app uses Bluetooth Low Energy Technology and is based on the BlueTrace protocol developed by the Singaporean Government.

Finland
The Finnish app Koronavilkku launched on 31 August 2020 with Finnish and Swedish localizations. An English translation was released later on.

France
The French National Assembly approved the release of "StopCovid" on 27 May 2020 to help combat the COVID-19 pandemic. StopCovid is a digital contact tracing app based on a bluetooth tracing protocol developed specially for the app. It was released on 2 June 2020. The app was later renamed TousAntiCovid. Updates have also included the addition of a "News" section with daily information about the state of the pandemic in France, as well as a "Forms" section to generate the travel declaration forms needed to go outside during the various lockdowns and curfews.

Germany
The official app called "Corona-Warn-App" was made available for download on 16 June 2020 and presented in a press conference the same day. It was developed as open-source software jointly by Deutsche Telekom and SAP with scientific advice from the federal Robert Koch Institute and uses the Exposure Notification APIs from Google and Apple.

Greece
The official platform in Greece against covid, called Covid Checker, is one of the first solution in Europe against COVID-19 pandemic that was approved and made available on 29 March 2020. Covid Checker is a mobile & web solution designed to identify coronavirus symptoms and associated risk, provide reliable guidance, & connect qualified patients with a doctor for further assistance. Covid Checker powered by Docandu was first released as a widget attached to the governmental websites such as the patt.gov.gr while few weeks later was released as an app in Google Playstore. It was developed jointly by DOCANDU, the Region of Attica and the Medical Association of Athens.

Ghana
The government launched "GH COVID-19 Tracker App", an Android and IOS app equipped with location tracking technology to provide detailed information about people who have been at the same event, location, country or other defined locations in order to provide accurate information to health authorities overtime to know who to screen and provide needed assistance. The app was developed by the Ministry of Communication and Technology and Ministry of Health. As of 14 April 2020, the app was awaiting approval by the Google Play Store and the Apple App Store.

Gibraltar
The "BEAT Covid Gibraltar" App, based on the App from Ireland, was launched on 18 June with downloads of 15,000 by 8 August, from an estimated 20,000 phone users.

Hong Kong
The government launched LeaveHomeSafe on 16 November 2020. It was initially not compulsory for people to use but starting from 18 February 2021, customers are required to scan the QR code with the app or register their contact details before entering some of the restaurants. However, the government refused to open the source code for peer-review by using an excuse of protecting the intellectual property of the program.

Hungary
VírusRadar, an Android app, was launched on 13 May and an iOS version on 30 May 2020. The app uses Bluetooth technology to track unique, random application IDs within a proximity of 2 meters for more than 20 minutes in the previous 14 days. The system has been developed by Nextsense, based on the company's contact tracing technology. According to the developer, a version of the application integrating Google and Apple's API is currently under testing. The app is operated under the umbrella of the Ministry for Innovation and Technology of Hungary, operated by the Governmental Agency for IT Development and supported by Biztributor.

Iceland
Rakning C-19 route tracking is a GPS logger app for Android and iOS, with a user interface and content from the national COVID-19 web page. When infection is confirmed the route data is used to support more traditional contact tracing. According to MIT Technology Review as of 11 May 2020 it had the largest national market penetration rate of contact trackers in the world, having been downloaded by 38% of Icelanders.

India
The Aarogya Setu app is developed by the National Informatics Centre that comes under the Ministry of Electronics and Information Technology, Government of India. The app is available on Google Play Store and Apple's App Store for download.
The MyGov app is developed by the National Informatics Centre that comes under the Ministry of Electronics and Information Technology, Government of India. The app is available on Google Play Store and Apple's App Store for download.

Ireland
The official COVID Tracker app was launched by the Irish government on 7 July 2020. Within two days of launch, the app had been downloaded by one million people. The Health Service Executive subsequently made the code behind the app available to other countries.

Israel
On 22 March 2020 the Ministry of Health launched "HaMagen" (המגן,"the shield"), an iOS and Android contact tracing app. Hamagen tracks a user's whereabouts using standard location APIs and then compares them to known movements of those diagnosed with COVID-19, in order to check if their paths crossed within the previous 14 days. The Hamagen app was specifically designed with a privacy-first approach where information about locations and times is cross-referenced on the user's device, and not transmitted on to the cloud database.

Italy
On 1 June 2020 the Ministry of Health launched the Italian Government's exposure notification solution, "Immuni", an iOS and Android contact tracing app build on top of the Google/Apple API. The solution was realized by the Special Commissioner for the COVID-19 emergency (Presidency of the Council of Ministers), in collaboration with the Ministry of Health and the Ministry for Technological Innovation and Digitalization. It only uses public infrastructures located within the national borders. It is exclusively managed by the public company Sogei S.p.A. The source code has been developed for the Presidency of the Council of Ministers by Bending Spoons S.p.A., and it is released under a GNU Affero General Public License version 3.

Japan
On 19 June 2020 the Ministry of Health, Labour and Welfare released COVID-19 Contact-Confirming Application (新型コロナウイルス接触確認アプリ, Shingata Koronauirusu Sesshoku Kakunin Apuri; COCOA). It is available on iOS 13.5 or above and Android 6 or above.

Jersey
Jersey COVID Alert is the official contact tracing mobile app for Jersey that was released on 14 October 2020.

Jordan
The AMAN App - Jordan app is developed for Jordan's Ministry of Health. AMAN is a privacy-conscious exposure detection App. The App was released on 21 May 2020 and is currently available on Google Play Store and App Store.

Latvia
A consortium of IT companies and volunteers launched decentralized proximity tracing Apturi Covid application on 29 May 2020. It is Android and Apple compatible. The county's president and government ministers installed the application on their phones on the launch day. Application developers hoped to reach 400 000 users, approximately 20% of the country's population.

Malaysia
The government launched MySejahtera on 16 April 2020, one of three tracing app that released alongside MyTrace and Gerak Malaysia. MySejahtera is a contact tracing app introduced by the National Security Council and the Ministry of Health on 16 April 2020 to retrieve updated information and statistics of the pandemic. MyTrace is a tracing app that utilizes Bluetooth to detect how long a user smartphone are in close proximity with other smartphone users with a similar app installed, and is currently available on Android. Gerak Malaysia is a tracing app which allows police and the Ministry of Health to track and analyze users movement, and register for permission to allow state border crossing.

Nepal
Nepal Engineers Association Launched COVIRA app, developed by Science Hub on 22 June 2020. COVIRA has been developed on a multidisciplinary framework where several facctors are considered to provide the risk level. It can be used for individual risk assessment which can be assessed from all over the world, and regional risk are provided for Nepal in palika level. This is available on web application platform.

Netherlands
The official contract tracing app by the Dutch government is called CoronaMelder.

New Zealand
The Health Ministry launched the NZ COVID Tracer on 20 May, though some users reported being able to access the App on 19 May. The app is available on Apple's App Store and Google Play. NZ COVID Tracer allows users to scan their own QR codes at businesses, public buildings and other organisations to track where they have been for contract tracing purposes. Bluetooth Exposure Notification System was added in December 2020.

North Macedonia
The government launched "StopKorona!" on 13 April 2020, becoming the first country in the Western Balkans to launch a COVID-19 tracing app. The Bluetooth-based app traces exposure with potentially infected persons and is designed to help healthcare authorities provide a fast response. The app was developed and donated by Skopje-based Software company Nextsense. To comply with laws on data protection, the app does not use the users' locations nor personal information. The users' mobile phone numbers are the only user-related data, stored on servers managed by the Ministry of Health.

Norway
The Smittestopp app is developed by the Norwegian government, and uses Bluetooth and GPS signals. On 15 June 2020 the country halted the app over privacy concerns after the Norwegian Data Protection Authority said low infections could no longer justify the risk of privacy invasion by the end user. The app ceased collecting new data and plans to delete all data collected so far with any additional collections effectively paused indefinitely.

Philippines
Staysafe is the official contact tracing app for the Philippines.

Portugal
Stayaway COVID is the official contact tracing mobile app for Portugal.

Qatar
Ehteraz application (app) has allowed Qatar citizens and residents to move with ease and responsibly in the country while helping the authorities prevent the spread of coronavirus (COVID-19). A Cabinet decision, which came into effect on 22 May, requires citizens and residents to mandatorily install and activate the mobile app on their smartphones when leaving the house for any reason. Since then, more and more entities in the country have made it compulsory for clients and visitors to show the green status on the Ehteraz app to be allowed entry into their premises. Apart from hypermarkets and other retail outlets, banks, as well as several commercial buildings and offices, in Qatar have put in place similar measures to help prevent the spread of COVID-19.

Saudi Arabia
Tabaud is the official mobile app for Web, Android and iOS, developed by the National Health Information Center (NHIC). It allows users to track and trace via Apple/Google Exposure Notification API. More than 1,000,000 users have downloaded the app.

Scotland
Protect Scotland is the official contact tracing app for Scotland. Scotland uses the Test and Protect method. Throughout the country they test people with symptoms, isolate people who were in close contact with positive testers, and limit exposure to as many people as possible.

Singapore
An app called TraceTogether is being used. It uses a digital contact tracing protocol called BlueTrace, developed with an open source reference implementation called OpenTrace.

South Africa
COVID AlertSA is a digital contact tracing app announced by the Government of South Africa on 8 August 2020 to help combat the ongoing COVID-19 pandemic.

Spain
The official app called Radar COVID has been released by the Ministry of Economic Affairs and Digital Transformation for Android and iOS for a pilot test in La Gomera. The app is based on the DP-3T protocol and uses the Apple/Google API for contact tracing and it is expected to be rolled out to further Spanish regions in September. In its first year, it only notified 74.280 out of more of 4 million infections. Less than 20% of citizens had installed it. Bugs and battery exhaustion discouraged further usage.

Slovenia
ZVem is a e-government platform for public health in the Republic of Slovenia. Citizens can access the web based platform and associated mobile app via SI-PASS, a secure authorization software developed for public platforms. Users of the service can make a doctor's appointment with few simple clicks. They can see their prescriptions and e-documents. During COVID-19 pandemic, e-documents were usable for the COVID-19 vaccination certificates. Health insurance information is available via the platform as well. The solution was developed by National Institute for Public Health and the Ministry for Health. And the mobile application for protecting public health and lives, #OstaniZdrav (#StayHealthy), is a tool that informs you if you have been in contact with an infected person. With its use and the observance of recommendations, each person contributes their share to restricting the spread of the virus and the protection of our own health, the health of our loved ones and that of society as a whole.

Switzerland
An app called SwissCovid which uses the DP-3T protocol and is built top of Apple/Google bluetooth API. Application is licensed under Mozilla Public License 2.0.

Taiwan
Taiwan AILabs in conjunction with the Taiwan Centers for Disease Control on 12 March 2021 released the Taiwan Social Distancing app for Android and iOS.

Turkey
Security was ensured by checking the HES codes received by the users at the entrances to closed areas. The HES codes of people who were in contact or became ill were processed as "sick" and kept in quarantine for 14 days. With this separate application, citizens could control the health status of people's immediate environment (mother, father, sibling). If someone with covid positive is too close to you, you can see this in the application and take precautions. It also counts how many people you have come into contact with who are covid positive.

United Kingdom

A brief video, showing the Wales and England app in action, produced by the Welsh Government.

The NHS COVID-19 contact tracing app for England and Wales was released on 24 September 2020. The NHS app uses Google/Apple exposure notification technology. (The NHS previously tried a centralised system rather than a decentralised approach). Scotland and Northern Ireland contact tracing apps were launched in the weeks prior to England & Wales. To aid contract tracing, the NHS COVID-19 contact tracing app for England and Wales allows users to scan official NHS QR code posters at businesses, venues and transport hubs. To ensure data integrity, the QR code is constructed from a JSON Web Signature (JWS). On 28 September 2021, the Citizen Lab published an analysis of COVID-19 data collection practices in Canada, the United Kingdom, and the United States.
As of 27 April 2023 the NHS COVID-19 App was discontinued.

== Countries considering deployment ==
=== Centralized approaches ===
In the United Kingdom, Matthew Gould, chief executive of NHSX, the government body responsible for policy regarding technology in the NHS, said in late March 2020 that the organisation was looking seriously at an app that would alert people if they had recently been in contact with someone testing positive for the virus after scientists advising the government suggested it "could play a critical role" in limiting lockdowns. On 22 April, the government announced that alpha testing of a prototype of the app was in progress at RAF Leeming. Beta testing began on the Isle of Wight on 5 May for council staff and NHS workers before a wider rollout to all residents on 7 May. By 15 May, over 72,000 had downloaded the app, equivalent to more than half of the island's population.

On 18 June, following reports that the app was only detecting 75% of contacts on Android devices and 4% of contacts on iPhones, the UK government announced that it would cease the development of its centralized system, and move to a decentralized system based on the Apple/Google Exposure Notification system. This was later scheduled for release in England and Wales on 24 September; by this date, the devolved administrations in Scotland and Northern Ireland had already released their own apps.

=== Decentralized approaches ===
Both Australia and New Zealand are considering apps based on Singapore's TraceTogether app and BlueTrace protocol as of April 2020.

Many countries have announced the official development, trial or adoption of decentralized proximity tracing systems, where the matching of proximity encounters happens locally on individuals' devices, such as the Decentralized Privacy-Preserving Proximity Tracing (DP-3T) protocol or the Google-Apple Exposure Notification API. These include Austria, Switzerland, Estonia, Latvia, Canada, Italy, Germany, Finland, the Netherlands, Ireland and Denmark.

In the United States, as of 10 June 2020, three states, Alabama, South Carolina, and North Dakota, have committed to using the Google-Apple Exposure Notification API. In May 2020, the U.S. state of Arizona began testing the Covid Watch app developed with the Apple/Google protocol. In August 2020, the app launched publicly for a phased roll-out in the state of Arizona. At least nineteen states have not yet decided, and at least seventeen other states stated there were no plans to use smartphone-based contact tracing.

=== Geofencing ===
Russia introduced a geofencing app, Social Monitoring, for patients diagnosed with COVID-19 living in Moscow, designed to ensure they do not leave home.

== List of apps by country ==
Note: This table should list only apps that are either supported by citations from third-party reliable sources or are from or supported by independently notable organizations such as national governments, industrial collaborations, major universities, NGOs, or one of the framework collaborations listed above. MIT Technology Review also maintained a Google spreadsheet listing of contact tracing and exposure notification apps that are being used around the world.

Country	Name	Functionality	Platform	Author/supporter	Status	Licence	Protocol	Homepage	Downloads	Ref
Afghanistan	ASAN	information, tracking	Web	Ministry of Public Health, Ministry of Telecommunications and Information Technology						
Angola	COVID-19 AO	self diagnostic, information and quarantine enforcement	Web	Ravelino de Castro		Proprietary		https://covid19ao.com/		
Argentina	CUIDAR	tracing	iOS, Android	Ministry of Health of the Argentine Republic	in use		QR code	https://www.argentina.gob.ar/aplicaciones/coronavirus		
Armenia	ArMed eHealth	contact tracing	iOS, Android	SYLEX SA National Centralized eHealth System of Armenia	in use			https://www.gov.am/en/covid-travel-restrictions/		
Armenia	COVID-19 Armenia	information	iOS, Android	Office of the Prime Minister of Armenia	in use			https://apps.apple.com/am/app/covid-19-armenia/id1505830061		
Australia	Coronavirus Australia	information, isolation registration	iOS, Android (discontinued)	Delv Pty Ltd / Australian Department of Health	Discontinued as of 26 August 2022	Proprietary, source code released		health.gov.au	27/04, 1.89 million; 26/04: 1 million	
Australia	COVIDSafe	contact tracing	iOS, Android (discontinued)	Australian Department of Health	Discontinued as of 16 August 2022	Proprietary, source code released	BlueTrace	covidsafe.gov.au	07/05, 4 million	
Austria	Stopp Corona	contact tracing, medical reporting	iOS, Android	Federal Ministry of Health, Austrian Federal Government	in use	Apache License 2.0	Exposure Notifications System	https://www.austria.info/en/service-and-facts/coronavirus-information/app		
Azerbaijan	e-Tabib	information	iOS, Android	Ministry of Communications and High Technologies, Administration of the Regional Medical Divisions	in use		Bluetooth	https://etabib.az/		
Bahrain	BeAware Bahrain	contact tracing	iOS, Android	Information and eGovernment Authority	in use			https://healthalert.gov.bh/en/category/beaware-bahrain-app		
Bangladesh	Corona Tracer BD	contact tracing	Android	Directorate General of Health Services & ICT Division	in use		Bluetooth	https://macademy.gov.bd/2020/11/25/govt-urges-to-use-corona-tracer-bd-app-to-curb-virus-spread/		
Bangladesh	Surokkha	Vaccination, Contact Tracing	Android	DGHS	in use			https://play.google.com/store/apps/details?id=com.codersbucket.surokkha_app&hl=en&gl=US		
Bhutan	Druk Trace	contact tracing	iOS, Android	Ministry Of Health	in use		QR code	https://www.moh.gov.bt/contact-tracing-app/ Apple Android		
Belgium	Coronalert	contact tracing, medical reporting	iOS, Android	Belgian government, Sciensano	in use	GPL3	DP-3T / ENS	coronalert.be	30/10: 1.7m	
Bolivia	Unidos Contra el Covid	contact tracing	iOS, Android	Ministry of Education	in use			https://www.minedu.gob.bo/index.php?option=com_content&view=article&id=4534:descarga-la-app-coronavirus-bolivia-covid19&catid=182&Itemid=854		
Brazil	Coronavírus - SUS	contact tracing	iOS, Android	Ministry of Health	in use			https://www.gov.br/saude/pt-br/vacinacao/		
Brazil	VirusMapBR (formerly The Spread Project)	contact tracing, medical reporting	iOS, Android	Manoel Lemos	APK file released, code released	BSD-3		https://github.com/mlemos/virusmapbr		
Brazil	Tô de Olho	Contact tracing, Individual and regional risk assessment, Selective infectious testing, Isolation levels monitoring	iOS, Android	MPRN/IMD	in use	Proprietary		https://todeolho.mprn.mp.br/		
Brunei	BruHealth	contact tracing	iOS, Android	MOH & HMS Brunei	in use		Bluetooth & GPS	http://www.moh.gov.bn/SitePages/bruhealth.aspx		
Bulgaria	ViruSafe	contact tracing	iOS, Android	Ministry of Health	in use			https://virusafe.info/ AppStore PlayStore		
Cambodia	Khmer Vacc	Vaccination, Medical Response	iOS, Android	Ministry Of Health	in use			https://www.khmertimeskh.com/50820744/health-ministry-launched-mobile-app-for-c-19-vaccination-management/ https://cambodia-vaccine.gov.kh/login		
Canada	COVID Alert	contact tracing	iOS, Android	Shopify, Blackberry, Canadian Government	in use	Apache License 2.0	Exposure Notifications System	http://www.canada.ca/en/public-health/services/diseases/coronavirus-disease-covid-19/covid-alert.html		
Canada	ABTraceTogether	contact tracing	iOS, Android	Alberta Government	in use			https://www.alberta.ca/ab-trace-together.aspx		
Canada	TeamSense	COVID screening app for employees pre-shift symptom screening, reporting and compliance dashboard	Web	TeamSense	In Use	Proprietary		https://www.teamsense.com		
Chile	CoronApp - Chile	information	iOS, Android	Ministry of Housing and Urbanism of Chile	in use			https://www.minvu.gob.cl/coronapp/		
China	"Health Code"	contact tracing	iOS, Android	integrated into Alipay and WeChat apps		Proprietary				
Colombia	CoronApp - Colombia	information	iOS, Android	National Institute of Health (INS)	in use			https://coronaviruscolombia.gov.co/Covid19/aislamiento-saludable/coronapp.html		
Czech Republic	eRouška	contact tracing	iOS, Android	Czech Ministry of Health and Hygiene	in use	MIT License	Exposure Notifications System	erouska.cz		
Cyprus	CovTracer	contact tracing and warning	iOS, Android	Ministry of Health, Ministry of Research, Innovation and Digital	in use		Bluetooth	https://covtracer.dmrid.gov.cy/dmrid/covtracer/covtracer.nsf/covtracer04_en/covtracer04_en?OpenDocument		
Denmark	smitte|stop	contact tracing	iOS, Android	Ministry of Health (Denmark)	in use	Proprietary	Exposure Notifications System	smittestop.dk		
Ecuador	ASI	contact tracing	iOS, Android	Ministry of Telecommunications and Information Society (Ecuador)	in use	MPL 2.0	Exposure Notifications System	asiecuador.com		
Ecuador	CovidEC	information	Android	Ministry of Telecommunications and the Information Society	in use			https://www.gobiernoelectronico.gob.ec/como-instalar-app-covidec/		
Egypt	Egypt Health Passport app	information	iOS, Android	Minister of Health and Population	announced on 31 July		QR code	https://egyptindependent.com/health-ministry-to-launch-health-passport-for-travel/		
Egypt	Sehet Misr	contact tracing	iOS, Android	Minister of Health and Population	in use		GPS	https://english.ahram.org.eg/NewsContent/1/64/367263/Egypt/Politics-/Egypts-health-ministry-launches-coronavirus-mobile.aspx		
Fiji	careFIJI	contact tracing	iOS, Android	Government of Fiji	in use	Open Source	BlueTrace	carefiji.digitalfiji.gov.fj		
Finland	Koronavilkku	contact tracing	iOS, Android	Ministry of Social Affairs and Health, THL, Solita, Kela, SoteDigi	Released on 31 August 2020	European Union Public License 1.2	Exposure Notifications System	koronavilkku.fi	05/11: 2.5M, representing 45% of population	
France	TousAntiCovid (formerly "StopCovid")	contact tracing	iOS, Android	Government of France / INRIA, ANNSI, Capgemini, Dassault Systèmes, INSERM, Lunabee studio, Orange, Santé publique France, Withings, Coalition Network	in use since 2 June 2020	MPL-2.0 and ad hoc	ROBERT	gitlab.inria.fr/stopcovid19		
France	ROBERT (ROBust and privacy-presERving proximity Tracing protocol)	contact tracing	unknown	INRIA			PEPP-PT	github.com/ROBERT-proximity-tracing		,
France	CheckYourMask	Checking the correct mask wearing by selfie	Android	Université de Haute-Alsace, Normandie Univ., Lille Univ.	Concept					,
Georgia	Stop Covid	contact tracing	iOS, Android	Novid20 / Georgian Ministry of Health	in use	GPL	PEPP-PT	novid20.org		
Germany	Ito	contact tracing	Android	Partners like TUM	APK file released	GPL3	TCN	www.ito-app.org		
Germany	OHIOH Research	contact tracing, scientific research	Browser compatible devices	OHIOH at FH Kiel	progressive web app	OHIOH Copyright@ Tjark Ziehm	TCN	ohioh.de		
Germany	Corona-Warn-App	contact tracing	iOS, Android	Robert Koch Institute	published	Apache License	Exposure Notifications System	https://coronawarn.app/	17/06: 6.5m, 18/06: 8m, 20/06: 10.6m, 25/06: 13.0m, 02/07: 14.4m	
Gibraltar	BEAT Covid Gibraltar	contact tracing	iOS, Android	Health Service Executive (HSE) / NearForm	in use (2020-06-18)	MIT License	Exposure Notifications System	www.gibraltar.gov.gi/beatcovidapp	13/07: 9,000, 08/08: 15,000	
Greece	DOCANDU Covid Checker	self diagnostic, information and 24/7 online doctor	Android, Web-based / Web-site Widget	DOCANDU, Region of Attica (Greece), Athens Medical Association (Greece)	in use (2020-03-26)			https://www.docandu.com/en	27/04, 18,000 users	
Ghana	GH COVID-19 Tracker App		Android, iOS: awaiting app store approvals	Ministry of Communication and Technology, Ministry of Health						
Hong Kong	StayHomeSafe	quarantine enforcement	Unknown	The Government Of The Hong Kong Special Administrative Region		Proprietary				
Hong Kong	LeaveHomeSafe	contact tracking	iOS, Android	The Office of the Government Chief Information Officer	in-use	Proprietary	QR-Code, Self-developed	https://www.leavehomesafe.gov.hk/en/		
Hungary	VírusRadar	contact tracing	iOS, Android	Ministry of Innovation and Technology and NextSense	in use (2020-05-13-)			https://virusradar.hu		
Hungary	EESZT Covid Control	information	iOS, Android	National Hospital Directorate General	in use		QR code	https://e-egeszsegugy.gov.hu/ AppStore PlayStore		
Iceland	Rakning C-19	route tracking	iOS, Android	Iceland's Department of Civil Protection and Emergency Management and Directorate of Health	in use (2020-04-01)	MIT License	GPS	https://www.covid.is/app/en	26/04, 50%	
India	Aarogya Setu(Sanskrit: the bridge to health)	contact tracing	iOS, Android	Union Government of India / National Informatics Centre	(Android version open-sourced)	Apache License		mygov.in/aarogya-setu-app	50million +	
India	COVA Punjab	contact tracing	iOS, Android	Government of Punjab						
India	COVID-19 Feedback	feedback	Android	Union Ministry of Electronics and Information Technology / Union Ministry of Health and Family Welfare						
India	COVID-19 Quarantine Monitor	contact tracing, geofencing	TBA	Government of Tamil Nadu / Pixxon AI Solutions						
India	Corona Kavach	information	Android (discontinued)	Union Ministry of Electronics and Information Technology / Union Ministry of Health and Family Welfare						
India	GoK Direct	information	iOS, Android	Government of Kerala / Qkopy (for Android), MuseON Communications (for iOS)		Proprietary				
India	Mahakavach	contact tracing	Android	Government of Maharashtra						
India	Quarantine Watch	contact tracing	Android	Government of Karnataka						
India	Test Yourself Goa	self diagnostic	Android	Government of Goa / Innovaccer						
India	Trackcovid-19.org	self diagnostic, syndromic surveillance	Web	Trackcovid-19.org	In Use	Open		https://www.trackcovid-19.org/		
India	Test Yourself Puducherry	self diagnostic	Android	Government of Puducherry / Innovaccer						
Indonesia	PeduliLindungi	contact tracing	iOS, Android	Indonesian Ministry of Communication and Information Technology	in use (2020-06-16)			Article title		
Iran	AC19	contact tracing	android	Minister of Information and Communications Technology						
Ireland	COVID Tracker Ireland	contact tracing, health info, EU Digital Vaccination Certificate, EU Digital Recovery Certificate	iOS, Android	Health Service Executive (HSE) / NearForm	in use (2020-07-07)	MIT License	Exposure Notifications System	https://covidtracker.gov.ie https://github.com/HSEIreland/covid-tracker-app	2,190,000+	
Israel	Hamagen (Hebrew: המגן "the shield")	contact tracing	iOS, Android	Israeli Health Ministry	in use, open source	MIT License		https://govextra.gov.il/ministry-of-health/hamagen-app/download-en/		
Italy	Covid Community Alert	CovidApp for citizens (proximity tracing and exposure notification, optional GPS location sharing), CovidDoc for doctors (scan patient QR code, log patient health status), web dashboard for epidemiologists (set parameters that trigger notifications)	iOS, Android, web	Coronavirus Outbreak Control	Released	Open source, unclear	TCN	https://coronavirus-outbreak-control.github.io/web/		
Italy	diAry "Digital Arianna"	GPS location tracing, exposure notification, awareness raising	iOS, Android	University of Urbino / DIGIT srl	Released, open beta	MIT License	GPS, own	https://covid19app.uniurb.it/		
Italy	Immuni	Exposure Notifications	iOS, Android	Bending Spoons / Ministry of Health (Italy) / Presidency of the Council of Ministers (Italy) / Ministry for Technological Innovation and Digitalization	Released	GNU AGPLv3	Exposure Notifications System	https://www.immuni.italia.it/	21/10: 9.229.190	
Italy	SM-COVID-19	Contact Tracing	iOS, Android	SoftMining	Released	Closed source, private specifications	ReCoVer	smcovid19.org		
Japan	COVID-19 Contact-Confirming Application (新型コロナウイルス接触確認アプリ, Shingata Koronauirusu Sesshoku Kakunin Apuri)	Contact Tracing	iOS, Android	COVID-19 Radar Japan	Released	Proprietary Core: MPL 2.0	Exposure Notifications System	https://www.mhlw.go.jp/stf/seisakunitsuite/bunya/cocoa_00138.html	25/08: 14,790,000	
Jersey	Jersey COVID Alert	contact tracing	iOS, Android	Digital Jersey	Released	Apache-2.0 License	Exposure Notification System	covidalert.gov.je		
Jordan	AMAN (أمان "Safety")	Exposure Detection	iOS, Android	Jordan's Ministry of Health	Released		GPS	https://www.amanapp.jo/en	600,000	
Kazakhstan	Ashyq	contact tracing	iOS, Android, Web	Ministry of Health	in use		QR code	https://egov.kz/cms/en/articles/prilozhenie-ashyq		
Kuwait	Shlonik	contact tracing	iOS, Android	Ministry of Health, Central Agency of Information Technology	in use		Bluetooth	https://www.moh.gov.kw/en/pages/MOHApp.aspx Android		
Kyrgyzstan	STOP COVID-19	contact tracing	iOS, Android	State Committee for IT and Communications,	in use			https://t.me/COVID19_KyrgyzstanBot		
Laos	LaoKYC	contact tracing	iOS, Android	Lao National Taskforce for COVID-19 Prevention and Control, Ministry of Post and Telecommunications, Ministry of Health, Ministry of Technology and Communications	Released		QR code	https://www.covid19.gov.la/index.php		
Latvia	Apturi Covid	Exposure Detection	iOS, Android	Consortium of volunteers, Ministry of Health of the Republic of Latvia	Released	Creative Commons Attribution-ShareAlike 4.0 International	Exposure Notifications System	apturicovid.lv		
Lebanon	MOPH	information	iOS, Android	Ministry of Health	in use			https://www.moph.gov.lb/en/Pages/127/28140/download-the-official-moph-mobile-app-new-version-		
Luxembourg	CovidCheck.lu	contact tracing	iOS, Android	The Luxembourg Government	in use		QR code	https://covid19.public.lu/en/covidcheck/app.html		
Malaysia	Gerak Malaysia	Border control, contact tracing	Android, iOS, HarmonyOS	RMP, MCMC	Discontinued as of 31 July 2020	Proprietary				
Malaysia	MySejahtera	Contact tracing, self-quarantine, vaccination	Android, iOS, HarmonyOS	Entomo (formerly KPISoft), MKN, MOH, MAMPU, MCMC, MOSTI	In use	Proprietary	QR code, Bluetooth	mysejahtera.moh.gov.my/en/		
Malaysia	MyTrace	Contact tracing	Android, iOS, HarmonyOS	MOSTI	Discontinued	Proprietary	Bluetooth	www.malaysia.gov.my/portal/content/30955		
Maldives	TraceEkee	contact tracing	iOS, Android	Ministry Of Health	in use		Bluetooth	https://trace.hpa.gov.mv/ Apple Android		
Malta	COVID Alert Malta	contact tracing	iOS, Android	Federal Ministry of Health, Austrian Federal Government	in use		Bluetooth	https://covidalert.gov.mt/		
Monaco	Safe Pass	information	web	Monaco Government	in use			https://vaccination-covid19.gouv.mc/en/request-your-health-pass		
Mongolia	Ersdel	Exposure Detection	iOS, Android	State Emergency Committee, Communications and Information Technology Authority, Ministry of Health	in use		Exposure Notifications System	https://play.google.com/store/apps/details?id=gov.mn.enx&hl=en&gl=US		
Morocco	Wiqaytna (وقايتنا "Our prevention")	contact tracing	iOS, Android	Ministry of Interior	In use	GNU GPLv3 compatible with open source OpenTrace	Bluetooth	https://www.wiqaytna.ma		
Myanmar	Saw Saw Shar	information	iOS, Android	Ministry of Transport and Communication (MOTC), Ministry of Health and Sports (MOHS)	in use			Apple Android		
Netherlands	PrivateTracer	contact tracing	iOS, Android	Milvum, YES!Delft, Odyssey, The Hague		MIT Licence	Exposure Notifications System	privatetracer.org		
Netherlands	CoronaMelder	contact tracing	iOS, Android	Ministry of Health, Welfare and Sport		European Union Public Licence		coronamelder.nl		
Nepal	COVIRA ("COVID-19 Risk Assessment tool")	Individual and regional risk assessment	web	Science Hub	In use	GNU GPLv3 compatible with open source OpenTrace		https://www.covira.info		
New Zealand	NZ COVID Tracer	Point-of-interest journal, contact tracing, medical reporting, information	iOS, Android	Ministry of Health	in use	AGPLv3	QR code and Exposure Notifications System	https://tracing.covid19.govt.nz/	1,940,080 registered users	
North Macedonia	StopKorona!	contact tracing	iOS, Android	Ministry of Health (North Macedonia), Nextsense		Proprietary	Bluetooth	stop.koronavirus.gov.mk/en		
Norway	Smittestopp	contact tracing, route tracking	iOS, Android	Simula Research Laboratory / Norwegian Institute of Public Health (FHI)	in use	Proprietary	Exposure Notifications System	https://helsenorge.no/smittestopp	20 April, 1.2m	
Oman	Tarassud	information	iOS, Android	Ministry of Health	in use			https://tarassud.moh.gov.om/#/login Apple Android		
Pakistan	COVID-19 Gov PK	contact tracing	iOS, Android	Ministry of IT and Telecommunication	in use		Bluetooth	https://moitt.gov.pk/NewsDetail/NjQ3NWQyMDMtYTBlYy00ZWE0LWI2YjctYmFmMjk4MTA1MWQ0 Apple Android		
Pakistan	PAK COVID-19 Vaccination Pass	information	iOS, Android	NCOC & NADRA	in use		QR Code	https://nims.nadra.gov.pk/nims/privacyPolicy Apple Android		
Pakistan	PassTrack	assessment	iOS, Android	Ministry of Information Technology & Telecom, Ministry of Health, National Command and Control Center	in use			https://covid.gov.pk/intl_travellers/current_policies Apple Android		
Paraguay	COVID-19 PY	information	Android	Ministry of Public Health and Social Welfare, Ministry of Information Technologies and Communications	in use			https://apps.paraguay.gov.py/covid-19-py/		
Peru	Perú en tus manos (Peru in your hands)	information	iOS, Android	Presidency of the Council of Ministers, Ministry of Health	in use			https://www.gob.pe/institucion/pcm/noticias/150943-gobierno-lanza-nueva-version-de-app-peru-en-tus-manos-para-advertir-a-los-ciudadanos-sobre-las-zonas-con-mayor-probabilidad-de-contagio https://apps.apple.com/ve/app/peru-en-tus-manos/id1506397362		
Philippines	SafePass	contact tracing, employee management, business capacity management	Web	authors: Talino Venture, Amihan supporters: Department of Tourism, Department of Trade and Industry, IATF-EID	in use	Proprietary		https://www.safepass.asia/about		
Philippines	StaySafe	contact tracing, self diagnostic	iOS, Android, Web	author: Multisys Technologies Corporation supporters: Department of the Interior and Local Government, Department of Health, IATF-EID	in use	Proprietary	Exposure Notifications System	https://www.staysafe.ph/		
Poland	ProteGO Safe	contact tracing, medical reporting, information	iOS, Android	authors: Jakub Lipinski, Karol Kostrzewa, Dariusz Aniszewski; supporter: Ministry of Digital Affairs of Poland	in use	GNU GPLv3 + GNU AGPLv3	Exposure Notifications System	github.com/ProteGO-safe		
Portugal	STAYAWAY COVID	contact tracing	iOS, Android	INESC TEC / ISPUP / Keyruptive / Ubirider	in use	European Union Public License 1.2	Exposure Notification System	stayawaycovid.pt		
Qatar	EHTERAZ	contact tracing	iOS, Android	Ministry of Public Health, Ministry of Interior	in use		GPS Bluetooth QR code	Apple Android		
Russia	StopCoronaVirus My Contacts	contact tracing	iOS, Android	Ministry of Digital Development, Communications and Mass Media	in use		Bluetooth	https://www.themoscowtimes.com/2020/11/17/russia-develops-coronavirus-contact-tracing-app-a72068		
Russia	Contact Tracer	Digital Contact Tracing and Alerting	iOS, Android	SoftTree	in use		GPS Bluetooth	https://contacttracer.ru/app		
Saudi Arabia	Tawakkalna	Contact Tracing	iOS, Android	Saudi Data and Artificial Intelligence Authority (SDAIA)	in use		Bluetooth	https://ta.sdaia.gov.sa/en/index		
Saudi Arabia	Corona Map	Self Diagnostic Information	iOS, Android, Web	National Health Information Center	in use			https://coronamap.sa/ Apple Store Google Play		
Saudi Arabia	Tabaud - تباعد	Contact Tracing	iOS, Android	Saudi Data and Artificial Intelligence Authority (SDAIA)	in use		Exposure Notifications System	App Store		
Singapore	TraceTogether	contact tracing	iOS, Android	Government Digital Services agency of Government Technology Agency of Singapore	Closed down on 10 January 2024	GNU GPLv3 compatible with open source OpenTrace / BlueTrace framework	BlueTrace	https://www.tracetogether.gov.sg/	2 million (4 Jan 2021) (Note: Excludes users who use both the physical token and the app, or the physical token exclusively.)	
Slovakia	OverPass	information	Android, Web	Ministry Of Health	in use		QR code	https://spectator.sme.sk/c/22726609/state-app-to-check-green-covid-passes-is-now-available.html https://automat.gov.sk/		
Slovenia	#Ostanizdrav	Contact Tracing	Android, iOS	Ministry Of Health	in use		Exposure Notification System	https://play.google.com/store/apps/details?id=si.gov.ostanizdrav&hl=sl&gl=US	over 100.00 (8 Jun 2022)	
South Korea	Corona 100m	contact tracing	Android (no longer available)	Bae Won-Seok / TINA3D						
South Korea	Self-Diagnosis app	self-diagnostic	iOS, Android	Ministry of Health and Welfare				ncov.mohw.go.kr/selfcheck		
South Korea	Self-Quarantine app	isolation registration	iOS, Android	Ministry of the Interior and Safety				www.safekorea.go.kr		
South Africa	COVID Alert South Africa	Contact tracing, Exposure Notifications	iOS, Android	Department Of Health	In Use Nation Wide		Exposure Notifications System	Homepage Google Play App Store App Gallary	Android - 1,000,000+ AppGallary 250,000+	
Spain	Radar COVID	contact tracing	iOS, Android	Ministry of Economic Affairs and Digital Transformation, Indra Sistemas	Available in Play Store and App Store	MPL-2.0	Exposure Notifications System	Apple Store, Google Play	7,666,168	
Sri Lanka	Self Shield (Formerly COVID Shield)	Self-Health Checking and monitoring, AI driven breathing performance assessment, Quarantine Monitoring and Support, reporting test state, demographic mapping	Android	Commonwealth Centre for Digital Health	Available in Play Store	Proprietary		https://sshield.org		
Sweden	COVID Symptom Study	contact tracing	iOS, Android	Faculty of Medicine Lunds University	in use			http://www.covid19app.lu.se/		
Switzerland	TrackCorona	contact tracing	Web	University of Lugano, Oxylabs	in use			https://coronamapper.com/		
Switzerland	SwissCovid	contact tracing	iOS, Android	Ubique, EPFL, ETH Zurich	in use	MPL 2.0	Exposure Notifications System	https://github.com/DP-3T/dp3t-app-android-ch		
Taiwan	Taiwan Social Distancing	contact tracing	iOS, Android	Taiwan AI Labs, Taiwan Centers for Disease Control	in use		Exposure Notifications System	App Store, Google Play	1 million+ (18 May)	
Tajikistan	CoronaCheck	assessment	iOS, Android	Digital Health Resource Centre	in use			https://asiaplus.news/en/2020/06/10/coronavirus-self-assessment-mobile-app-launched-for-tajikistan/		
Thailand	Mor Prom	vaccination data	iOS, Android	Ministry Of Public Health	in use		QR Code	https://www.moph.go.th/index.php/COVID_19_privacy_notice		
Thailand	Mor Chana	contact tracing	iOS, Android	Digital Government Development Agency	in use		GPS, Bluetooth	https://play.google.com/store/apps/details?id=com.thaialert.app&hl=en&gl=US		
Timor Leste	COVID-19 Timor-Leste	information	iOS, Android	Ministry of Health	in use			https://covid19.gov.tl/en/covid-mobile-apps-apple-and-android/		
Turkey	HES Code	contact tracing	iOS, Android	Ministry of Health	in use			https://hayatevesigar.saglik.gov.tr/hes-eng.html App Store Android		
UAE	ALHOSN	digital tracing	iOS, Android	Ministry of Health and Prevention	in use		Bluetooth	https://www.ncema.gov.ae/alhosn/index.html		
Ukraine	Act at Home	assessment	iOS, Android	Ministry of Digital Transformation of Ukraine	in use			https://www.kmu.gov.ua/en/news/yak-pracyuye-zastosunok-dij-vdoma Apple Android		
United Kingdom	NHS COVID-19	multipurpose	iOS, Android	Zühlke Engineering for NHSX	Released on 24 September for users in England and Wales. Closed Down as of 27 April 2023	MIT License	Exposure Notifications System	covid19.nhs.uk	10 million+	
United Kingdom	Protect Scotland	contact tracing	iOS, Android	NearForm for NHS Scotland Test and Protect	In use; released on 10 September for users in Scotland.	Apache License 2.0	Exposure Notifications System	protect.scot	1,080,699 (20 September)	
United Kingdom	StopCOVID NI	multipurpose	iOS, Android	NearForm	In use; released on 30 July for users in N. Ireland.	MIT License	Exposure Notifications System	nidirect.gov.uk	250,000 (14 August)	
United Kingdom	COVID Symptom Study, formerly Covid Symptom Tracker	self-diagnostic	iOS, Android	King's College London, Guy's and St Thomas' Hospitals, Zoe Global Limited				https://covid.joinzoe.com/	4 May 3 million	
United States	COVID-19 Screening Tool	self-diagnostic	Web	Apple Inc. / CDC						
United States	CovidSafe	self-diagnostic, contact tracing	iOS, Android	Microsoft volunteers, University of Washington		MIT License	PACT	https://covidsafe.cs.washington.edu/		
United States	Covid Watch	exposure alerts / anonymous contact tracing	iOS, Android	Covid Watch	piloting	Apache 2.0	Exposure Notifications System	https://www.covidwatch.org/		
United States	coEpi	self-reporting	iOS, Android	coEpi			TCN			
United States	How We Feel	self-diagnostic	iOS, Android	Pinterest and others						
United States	NOVID	contact tracing	iOS, Android	Expii, CMU			TCN	https://www.novid.org/		
United States	Preworkscreen	Employee pre-shift screening, reporting, and documenting	iOS, Android, Web	Preworkscreen	Released on App Store and Play Store	Proprietary		https://preworkscreen.com/		
United States	Private Kit: Safe Paths	contact tracing	iOS, Android	MIT		MIT License		safepaths.mit.edu		
United States	PathCheck	contact tracing	iOS, Android	MIT		MIT License		pathcheck.org		
United States	TeamSense	Covid screening app for employees. Pre-shift symptom screening, reporting and compliance dashboard	Web	TeamSense	In Use	Proprietary		https://www.teamsense.com		
United States	ProjectCovid	self diagnostic, information, HIPAA Compliant	iOS, Android	LFR International	Released					
United States	QuikLAB™	medical reporting, test tracking, HIPAA compliant, lab patient log-in and reporting.	iOS, Android, web	https://tptmedtech.com/	in-use	Proprietary				
United States	QuikPASS™	COVID-19 check and verify passport, HIPAA compliant	iOS, Android, web	https://tptmedtech.com/	in-use	Proprietary				
United States	We-Care	anonymous contact tracing	web	https://we-care.world/	in-use	University of California, Davis				
Uzbekistan	Self-Safety	contact tracing	iOS, Android	Ministry of Health, Ministry for the Development of Information Technologies and Communications	in use		GPS Bluetooth	https://coronavirus.uz/ru/self-safety		
Venezuela	Nezha	logging and reporting	iOS, Android	Technovation Girls	under development			https://www.youtube.com/watch?v=paOCnfaTgKc		
Vietnam	PC-Covid	contact tracing, medical reporting	iOS, Android	Ministry of Health, Ministry of Information and Communications	Available in Play Store and App Store	GNU License		https://pccovid.gov.vn/		
global	World Health Organization COVID-19 App	information	iOS, Android	World Health Organization	under development	MIT Licence		WorldHealthOrganization/app		
global	Coalition App	contact tracing	iOS, Android, third party hardware	Coalition Network	Live	GPL 3	Whisper Tracing Protocol	Article title		

== See also ==
- General Data Protection Regulation (GDPR)
- Government by algorithm
- SM-COVID-19
