= SafePass =

Philippine COVID-19 app

- Developer: Talino Venture Labs; Amihan Global Strategies
- Type: COVID-19 app
- Launched: 2020
- Status: Active
- Pricing model: Free / subscription (for paid plans)
- Website: www.safepass.asia

SafePass is a digital contact tracing app used as a response against the COVID-19 pandemic in the Philippines.

== History ==
Safepass was developed by Amihan Global Strategies and Talino Venture Labs. It was originally launched in June 2020 by the Department of Tourism, the Department of Trade and Industry and Talino Ventures. It was made as a contact tracing tool with capacity planning features that would also help businesses to manage COVID-19 safety protocols within their premises. On August 14, 2020, a free version of SafePass was made available for business establishments nationwide.

== Features ==
SafePass features vary by plan. It is touted as an "omni-channel" system which can also be accessed by telephone, SMS or Facebook Messenger. The most basic plan, available to any establishment, provides basic contact tracing and a digital health questionnaire. Other plans include employee management features and a capacity planning tool which set how many individuals can be in a location at any given time. Paid plans allow for businesses to notify multiple contacts at once and allow their customers to make advanced bookings.

== Adoption ==
Safepass was adopted on June 1, 2020, by the Inter-Agency Task Force for the Management of Emerging Infectious Diseases (IATF-EID) as a "COVID-19 prevention and incident management platform for all business establishments" and is intended to complement StaySafe. SafePass has been adopted as a contact tracing app by several local government units (LGUs) in the Philippines such as Quezon City (KyusiPass) and Ilocos Norte. Another contact tracing app sanctioned by the government is StaySafe, which is used by other LGUs and companies.
