= Christophe Fraser =

British epidemiologist

Professor Christophe Fraser
- Born: 1973 (age 52–53)

Academic background
- Education: Edinburgh University BSc, Swansea University PhD
- Thesis: Supersymmetric Monopoles and Duality in Non-Abelian Gauge Theories (1997)

Academic work
- Discipline: Epidemiology; Infectious diseases
- Institutions: Pandemic Sciences Institute
- Main interests: Mathematical modelling of infectious diseases, Viral evolution, Antimicrobial resistance, Emerging infectious disease
- Website: https://www.psi.ox.ac.uk/our-team/christophe-fraser-3

Christophe Fraser is a professor of Infectious Disease Epidemiology in the Pandemic Sciences Institute, part of the Nuffield Department of Medicine at the University of Oxford.

Fraser's PhD and initial postdoctoral research were in theoretical particle physics. He converted to infectious disease epidemiology in 1998, based first at the University of Oxford then at Imperial College London, where he became Chair of Theoretical Epidemiology and served as deputy director of the MRC Centre for Outbreak Analysis and Modelling. He returned to the University of Oxford in 2016 as Senior Group Leader in Pathogen Dynamics at the Big Data Institute. In 2022 he was appointed Moh Family Foundation Professor of Infectious Disease Epidemiology as part of the University of Oxford's newly created Pandemic Sciences Institute.

== Research on HIV ==
Fraser and colleagues were among the first to hypothesise that the large variability in virulence observed between individuals living with HIV could be partly due to genetic variation in the virus. In other words, they hypothesised that virulence, considered as a phenotype of the virus, has appreciable heritability. They and others later provided evidence for this. Fraser was principal investigator of the BEEHIVE project to investigate the mechanism of this heritability, which discovered the 'VB variant': a highly virulent strain within the B subtype of HIV found in 107 individuals living with HIV in the Netherlands. UNAIDS stated that the discovery "provides evidence of urgency to halt the pandemic and reach all with testing and treatment".

== Research on the COVID-19 pandemic ==
In March 2020 Fraser and his research group published epidemiological modelling supporting 'digital contact tracing' using COVID-19 apps to reduce the spread of SARS-CoV-2. Fraser provided advice to the British government and more broadly about implementing such apps, including designing a risk evaluation algorithm with Anthony Finkelstein and others. Fraser's team developed the OpenABM-COVID-19 agent-based model, used by the NHS to model the pandemic, winning the 2021 Analysis in Government award for Innovative methods.

== Research on other outbreaks ==
Fraser worked on the 2002–2004 SARS outbreak, the 2009 swine flu pandemic, the 2012 MERS outbreak and the Western African Ebola virus epidemic.

== Methodological research ==
Fraser's publications include "Factors that make an infectious disease outbreak controllable", 2004, which argued that in addition to the basic reproduction number $R_0$ a second key parameter of an infectious disease is the proportion of transmission that occurs before the onset of symptoms. This proportion being large for SARS-CoV-2 was a key difficulty in infection control for the COVID-19 pandemic.

Fraser's 2007 analysis "Estimating Individual and Household Reproduction Numbers in an Emerging Epidemic" first defined an estimator for the instantaneous (time-varying) reproduction number $R(t)$ that was subsequently widely used. The definition was obtained by inverting the standard relationship between the reproduction number, the generation time distribution and the parameter $r$ of the Malthusian growth model that is implied by the renewal equation for epidemic dynamics (or the Euler-Lotka equation as it is known in demography; the two are equivalent due to actual births being analogous to infectious disease transmissions as 'epidemiological births', giving rise to a new infected individual).
