= SM-COVID-19 =

Digital contact-tracing app

- Initial release: 20 March 2020; 5 years ago
- Written in: Kotlin, Java
- Operating system: Android and iOS
- Available in: 2 languages
- List of languages English, Italian
- Type: COVID-19 app
- Website: www.softmining.it/index.php/sm-covid19-app/

SM-COVID-19 is a proprietary general-purpose digital contact tracing application that utilizes a centralized approach for COVID-19 contact tracing.

Initially, this application was launched in the Campania region of Italy and, it is based on the ReCoVer protocol and was developed primarily for scientific research.

== History ==
The initial phase of experimentation commenced on March 20, 2020, during the peak of the COVID-19 pandemic. On April 21, 2020, the project was expanded to encompass the entire Italian nation, making SM-COVID-19 the first officially sanctioned and available COVID-19 contact tracing app in Italy. It was developed pro-bono by a consortium of Italian startups SoftMining (leader), Nexus TLC, MinervaS (TruckY), PushApp and Biovista, with expertise in data analytics and web design .

The calculation of the risk factor developed through SM-COVID-19 was incorporated into the work of a governmental task force (Report sottogruppo di lavoro 6 - Page 11), which played a pivotal role in defining the requirements for contact tracing (CT) applications. This inclusion underscored the app's contribution to shaping national strategies and guidelines for digital contact tracing efforts.

The app does not make use of the Apple/Google Exposure Notification system that was released by Google and Apple only in May 2020. Due to the unavailability of the GAEN API at the application's launch, SM-COVID-19 incorporates a distance calculation correction mechanism that employs a sliding window approach alongside Received Signal Strength Indicator (RSSI) values to enhance accuracy.

The effectiveness and outcomes of SM-COVID-19's deployment have been documented in a publication on the Journal of Medical Internet Research (JMIR) entitled "Evaluating Epidemiological Risk by Using Open Contact Tracing Data: Correlational Study". This study presented the first evidence of a correlation between the number of contacts traced and the number of new SARS-CoV-2 positive cases, offering valuable insights into digital contact tracing's potential benefits.
