= NHSX =

IT unit for UK government health care services

NHSX was a United Kingdom Government unit from early 2019 to early 2022, with responsibility for setting national policy and developing best practice for National Health Service (NHS) technology, digital and data, including data sharing and transparency.

== History ==
NHSX was established in early 2019 by the Secretary of State for Health and Social Care, Matt Hancock, to bring together information technology teams from the Department of Health and Social Care, NHS England, and NHS Improvement. NHSX worked closely with the Government Digital Service and other relevant government functions. It was led by Matthew Gould. The 'X' in NHSX stood for "user experience". As a budget-holder, NHSX commissioned projects from NHS Digital.

In February 2021 it was announced that NHSX was to be merged into a new NHS England transformation directorate, which would bring together digital and operational improvement teams within NHS England and NHS Improvement. The NHSX brand would be retained.

In November 2021, it was announced that NHSX would be merged with NHS Digital and incorporated into NHS England, and the NHSX brand would be retired. The merger was completed in February 2022.

== Activities ==
One of the first initiatives announced in April 2019 was a programme to improve patient experience in the therapy areas of cancer and mental health. It would be a collaboration between technologists, clinicians and policymakers. The goal was to improve access to services for patients, to deliver the right diagnostic information to clinicians, and to provide researchers with healthcare data.

In May 2019, Hancock announced plans to upgrade all hospitals, GP practices and community care services to full fibre connectivity, which is intended to enable more video consultations and improve the speed of access to clinical information.

In a speech delivered on 12 June 2019, Baroness Blackwood, Parliamentary Under Secretary of State at the Department of Health and Social Care, identified three delivery priorities for NHSX, which are "focused on how we can make things better for patients and staff as soon as possible". These priorities are:

- cutting the amount of time that clinicians spend inputting and accessing data in NHS systems
- making it easier for patients to access key NHS services on a smartphone
- ensuring that essential diagnostic information can be accessed safely and reliably, from wherever a patient may be within the NHS.

Underlying these delivery priorities, she noted that the technical priority for NHSX is the creation of a "data-driven ecosystem". It was announced in January 2020 that £40 million was to be dedicated to improving login times for staff, using single sign-on technology.

One of the functions of the organisation is to manage the sharing of NHS patient data with industry.

In 2021 it was reported that the organisation was developing a programme aimed at accelerating the UK-wide adoption of digital records by social care providers. In September 2020 it found that 30% of social care providers were still using entirely paper-based systems and another 30% were only partially digitised. This initiative is intended to help the joining-up of care across social care and the NHS.

=== Paperless NHS ===
In June 2019 Gould admitted that the target of a paperless NHS by 2024 would be "a stretch". The target, first announced in 2013, has repeatedly been moved back from 2018, 2020, and 2023.

In September 2020 Gould told the public accounts committee that all 42 sustainability and transformation partnerships should have a shared care record for patients’ direct care in place by September 2021.

=== COVID-19 contact tracking app ===
In March 2020, NHSX commissioned a contact tracking app to monitor the spread of COVID-19, developed by the Pivotal division of American software company VMware. The first public trial of the app began on the Isle of Wight on 5 May 2020. The app stored anonymised data in a central database, in contrast to the decentralised Google / Apple contact tracing project. In early May, NHSX contracted for development of a second app using the Google / Apple method, which was made available to the public in September of that year.

=== Adoption Fund ===
In Autumn 2021, NHSx announced the first recipients of the Adoption Fund, set up to support innovation that:

- has some evidence base in the NHS and can support current priorities around elective recovery
- is compliant with NHSx's Digital Technology Assessment Criteria for Health and Social Care (DTAC), or on its way to being so
- is not being funded elsewhere by the NHS
- has potential for rapid, wide roll-out across the NHS.

During the first round of funding, £6.5 million was allocated to 35 applications such as gastroenterology pathways, musculoskeletal pathways, initiatives to support digital inclusion, and cardiology and cardiac surgery.

== See also ==
- NHS Digital
