= Koronavilkku =

Finnish COVID-19 app

Koronavilkku (Swedish: Coronablinkern, meaning "Corona signal" in English) was a COVID-19 app and a digital contact tracing mobile app developed by the Finnish Institute for Health and Welfare to inform citizens of when they may have been exposed to the COVID-19 virus. The app is inactive as of 1.6.2022. The free app became available for download on Google Play and App Store on August 31, 2020, and was downloaded one million times in the first day. By November 5, 2020, the app had been downloaded more than 2.5 million times.

The app was designed so that it did not tell the user the source of a potential infection, in order to ensure personal privacy. In a case of possible infection the users would receive a code that was entered into the application. Then the app notified those who have been in proximity to the infected individual that they may also have been exposed to the virus. The app did not collect any personal information such as identity or location. The regularly changed and randomly generated codes guaranteed that the users could not be directly identified from the codes.
