= PeduliLindungi =

Indonesian COVID-19 app

SatuSehat

- Screenshot Screenshot of the main page
- Developers: Telkom Indonesia & Ministry of Communication and Information Technology
- Release: 27 March 2020; 6 years ago (as PeduliLindungi)
Stable release
- Android: 5.7.1 / 29 June 2023; 3 years ago
- iOS: 5.7.1 / 30 June 2023; 3 years ago
- Operating system: Android and iOS
- Available in: Indonesian, English
- Type: COVID-19 apps
- Licence: Proprietary software
- Website: https://satusehat.kemkes.go.id/dashboard/

SatuSehat (Indonesian for "one health"), formerly PeduliLindungi (roughly "care to protect"), is a national integrated health data exchange platform, jointly developed by the Indonesian Ministry of Communication and Information Technology (Kemenkominfo), in partnership with Committee for COVID-19 Response and National Economic Recovery (KPCPEN), Ministry of Health (Kemenkes), Ministry of State-Owned Enterprises (KemenBUMN), and Telkom Indonesia. The SatuSehat platform aims to facilitate data accessibility and service efficiency for health providers and the government, and assist the public as a tool to access their own electronic medical record data. This app was the official COVID-19 contact tracing app used for digital contact tracing in Indonesia, and originally known as TraceTogether but later changed because Singapore had its app using the same name.

== Implementation ==
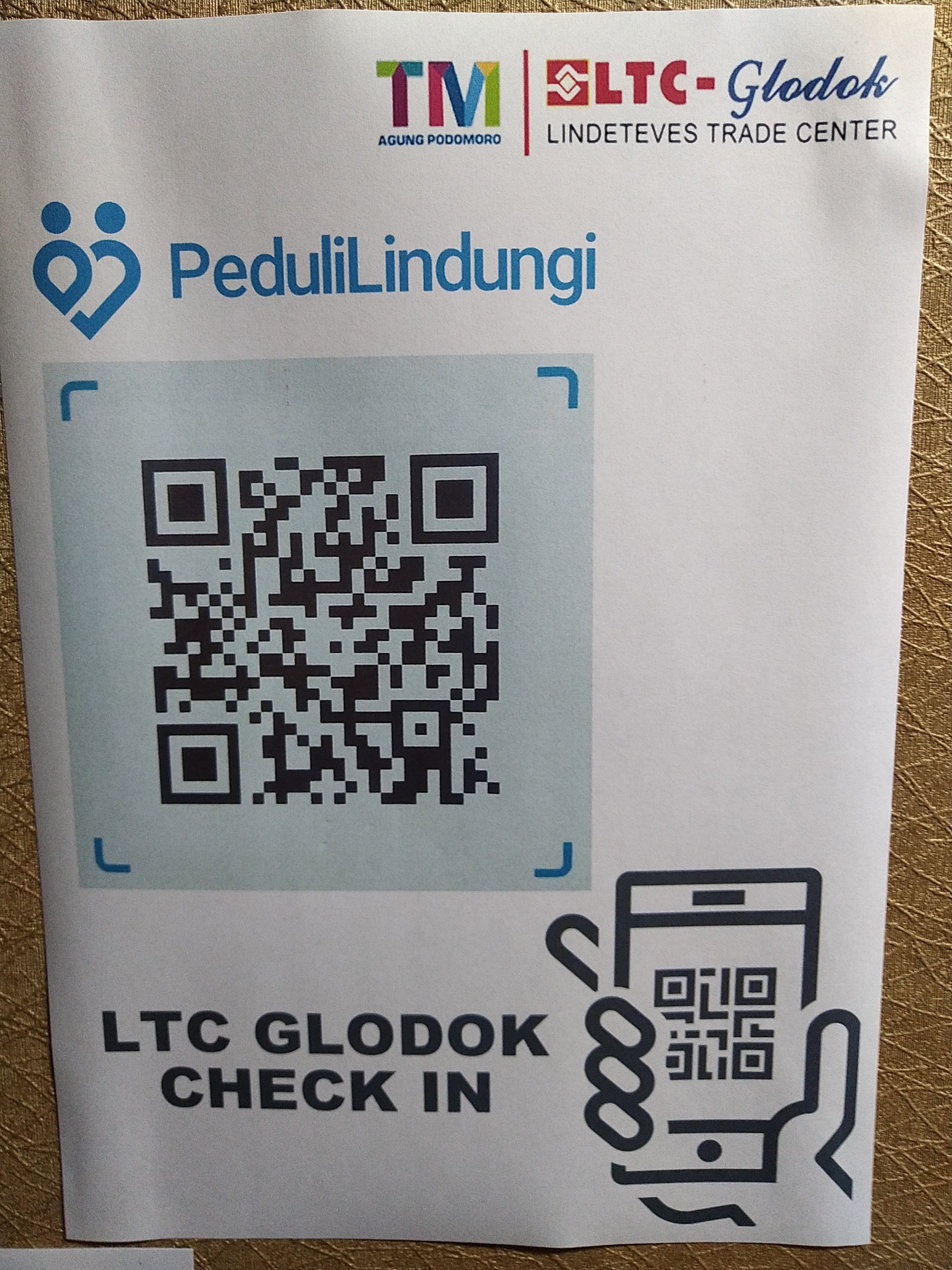
QR code to check in at LTC Glodok, West Jakarta

On 23 August 2021, Coordinating Minister for Maritime and Investments Affairs, Luhut Binsar Panjaitan, encouraged the government to make this app a mandatory requirement before using public transportations, such as train, bus, ferry, and plane. Furthermore, citizen must have installed the app before entering shopping malls, factories, and sport venues. Every person who have received at least a dose of vaccine will receive a vaccine card and vaccination certificate which can be downloaded from the app.

In December 2022, with the revocation of PPKM (Community Activities Restrictions Enforcement) starting from 1 January 2023, Ministry of Health issued a statement that the usage of the app is not a governmental mandatory requirement as it used to be.

=== Transition into a citizen health app ===
On 7 September 2022, it was announced that the app would be modified to become a citizen health app, capitalising on the reach of the app and the existing work done around the app. On 28 February 2023, the authorities announced that the app was rebranded to SATUSEHAT Mobile (lit. 'OneHealth Mobile'), with existing users needing to update the PeduliLindungi app and re-synchronise their COVID-19 related health information. The re-branded app would eventually be an all-in-one health service and records retrieval app for Indonesians.

== Controversy ==
It was reported that the app requires continuous access to the phone's files, media, and GPS, which quickly drains the battery. Allowing location access only during use or denying it altogether will render the app unusable. This stands in stark contrast to COVID-19 apps used in other countries that only utilize Bluetooth and do not require any additional permissions.

In September 2021, stored personal data of at least 1.3 million Indonesian residents were leaked online, including the vaccine certificate of President Joko Widodo. The data leak was also reported on eHAC (electronic Health Alert Card), a mandatory app used for air passengers.

== See also ==
- COVID-19 surveillance
- COVID-19 apps
