= Nepal Engineers Association =

Association of engineers in Nepal

Nepal Engineers' Association
- नेपाल ईन्जिनियर्स एसोसियसन
- Formation: 1962
- Type: Non-profit
- Headquarters: Pulchowk, Lalitpur
- Website: www.neanepal.org.np

Nepal Engineers' Association (NEA) (Nepali:नेपाल ईन्जिनियर्स एसोसियसन) is an independent non-profit organization of engineers of Nepal. Its headquarters is located in Pulchowk, Lalitpur. It was established in 1962. It has a provincial committee in each province of Nepal.

== Objectives ==
It has the following objectives:

- promote the development of the engineering science and technology
- promote fellowship and safeguard their rights and interests of engineers
- enhance participation of the national engineering manpower for national development activities
- develop relations, fellowship and goodwill with international engineering associations and institutions.

== Activities ==
- NEA celebrates its annual Engineers' day on Shrawan 3.
- Veteran engineers are facilitated with lifetime achievement awards and young and upcoming fellow engineers are recognized at the event. Apart for the annual event, NEA also holds international conventions every two years.
- Training and rapid response in disaster management.
- NEA conducts regular talk programs featuring experts and professionals from various fields, including Chiri Babu Maharjan.

== Members ==
Year 2022: 36,500 plus members

== International centers ==
- NEA Qatar, established 2004
- Australia
- Thailand
- United Kingdom
- Japan

== See also ==
- Nepal Engineering Council
