= Immuni =

Italian COVID-19 app

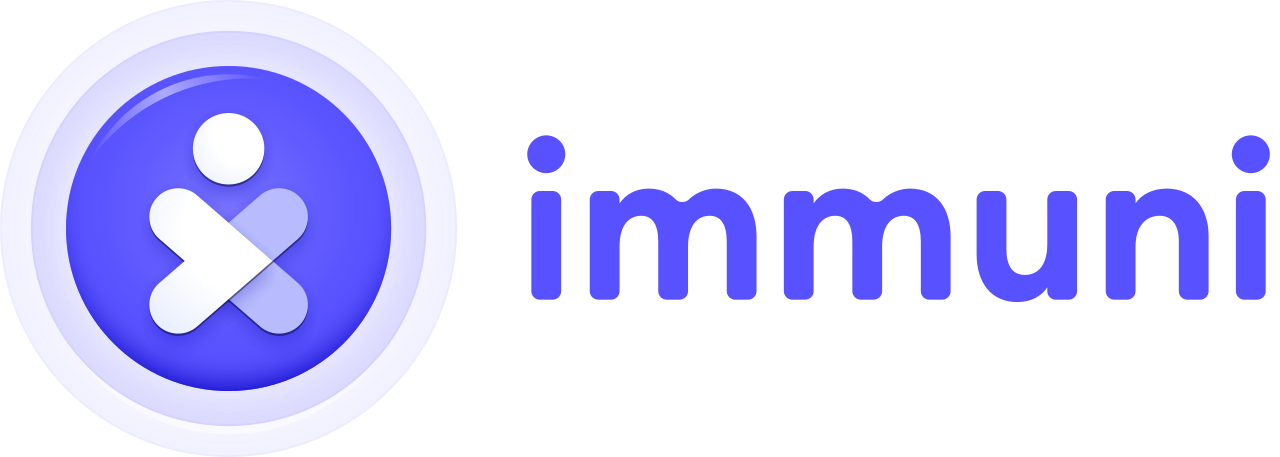
- Developer: Bending Spoons
- Release: 1 June 2020; 6 years ago
- Written in: Kotlin, Python, Swift
- Operating system: Android and iOS
- Available in: 5 languages
- List of languages English, French, German, Italian, Spanish
- Type: COVID-19 app
- Licence: GNU AGPLv3
- Website: www.immuni.italia.it
- Repository: github.com/immuni-app

Immuni was an open-source COVID-19 contact tracing app used for digital contact tracing in Italy, dismissed on 31 December 2022, after a long and debated criticism for having been a failure due to the lack of trust placed by citizens. Immuni COVID-19 contact-tracing app had in fact been downloaded only by 12% of Italians between 14 and 75 years old (the government had previously stated that, in order for the app to work properly, it should have been downloaded by at least 60% of Italians). It makes use of the Apple/Google Exposure Notification system.

== Development ==
It was developed by Bending Spoons and released by the Italian Ministry of Health on 1 June 2020. After a testing phase in 4 Italian regions (Abruzzo, Apulia, Liguria, Marche), the app started being active in the whole country on 15 June 2020. The app was initially released on App Store and Google Play, and since 1 February 2021 it is available on the Huawei AppGallery as well.

=== Source code ===
The source code was published on GitHub on the 25 May. The app only works in Italy, but compatibility with other European contact tracing apps was a goal. Since 19 October 2020 the app supports key-exchanges with the EU Interoperability Gateway and is therefore able to communicate with contact tracing apps of other EU countries.

== Shutdown ==
As of 16 December 2020, the app was downloaded more than 10 million times, a number which increased to 21.882.502 downloads the day before the app's shutdown.

On 27 December 2022 the Italian Ministry of Health announced that the app and its infrastructures will be dismissed on the 31 December of the same year.

== See also ==
- COVID-19 apps
