= Whisper Tracing Protocol =

Digital contact tracing protocol

- Communication protocol
- Purpose: Privacy Preserving Contact Tracing, Key Exchange
- Developers: Nodle, Coalition Network
- Introduction: April 2020

On April 16, 2020, Nodle released The Whisper Tracing Protocol white paper and the Coalition App on Android. The protocol is intended to be a privacy-first digital contact tracing tool developed for the 2020 COVID-19 pandemic. The project has been spun off into The Coalition Foundation. The protocol is being used for the Government of Senegal's Daancovid19 mobile contact tracing app initiative. Daancovid19 is the Senegalese digital response against the coronavirus. It was started by a handful of digital professionals and subsequently brought together nearly 500 volunteer experts from the private, public, and civil society. The respective Coalition App has been promoted by the City of Berkeley, California to their residents.

== Technical specification ==
The deployed system uses Bluetooth LE to exchange rotating public keys between two users. If a key is marked “infected” by the Network, users who have come into contact with the keys are notified. The protocol leverages a keyed hash function using 160 Bit BLAKE 2 (hash function) to generate user keys:

Seed: Generated and stored locally on the smartphone or user hardware.

Session Key: Generated weekly from the seed. This key is uploaded if a user declares they are infected.

Temporary ID: Generated Hourly (or less) from the session Key. This key is included in the bluetooth data packet.

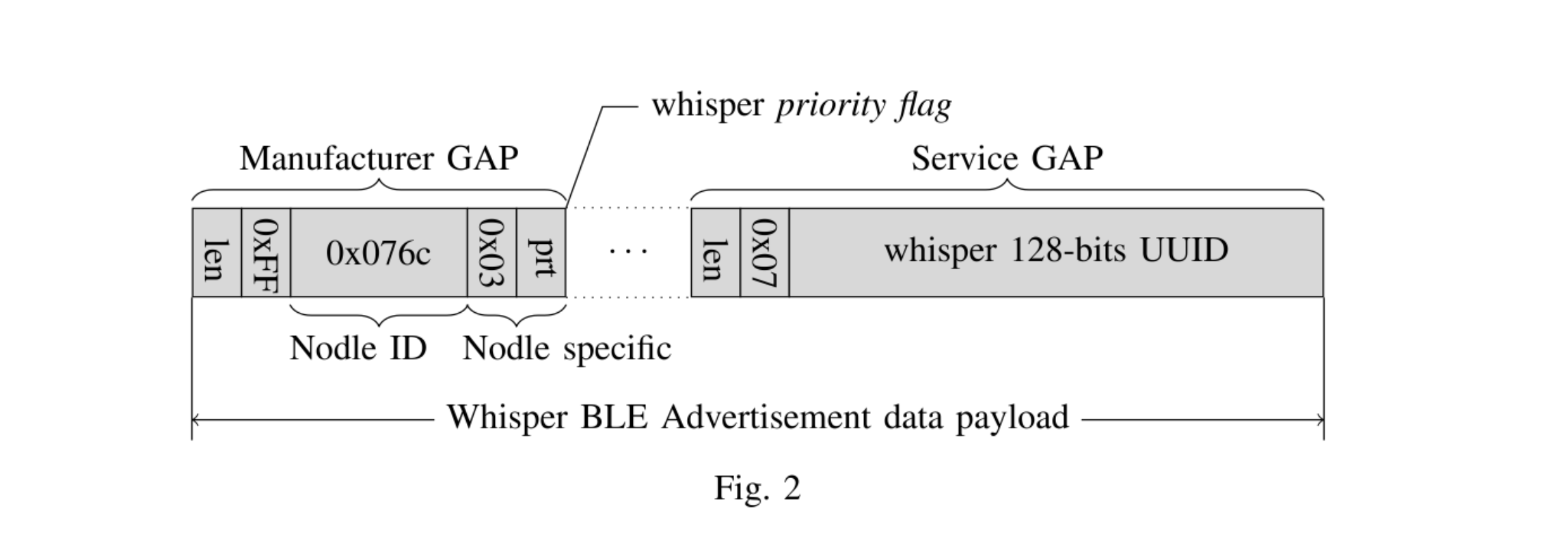
Whisper Tracing Protocol Bluetooth Data Format

Smartphones running the protocol record "proximity events" which may include the Temporary ID of the user in contact, time, signal strength, location, and other metadata. A key difference with other Digital contact tracing tools is that the Contacttracing happens locally on the phone, meaning that the system does not need to transmit location, or all of the user's proximity events to a server.

=== Adoption by Region ===
Country	Region	Supporter	Date Announced	Status
United States	Berkeley, California	City of Berkeley	April 2020	in-progress
