= PathCheck =

American nonprofit organization

PathCheck Foundation
- Founder: Ramesh Raskar
- Founded at: Cambridge, Massachusetts
- Type: 501(c)(3) organization
- Key people: Ramesh Raskar (Chairman); Graham Dodge (President (corporate title))
- Volunteers: 2,000+
- Website: pathcheck.org

PathCheck Foundation is a volunteer-led nonprofit organization founded in February 2020 at the Massachusetts Institute of Technology (MIT) that develops COVID-19 apps for digital contact tracing. The organization consists of over 1000 volunteers. In addition, various companies donate employee time to the foundation. The organization was previously known as COVID Safe Paths (and before MIT Safe Paths) but was renamed PathCheck Foundation on June 28, 2020.

The original technology for the PathCheck app was based on the MIT Private Kit: Safe Paths app created by Ramesh Raskar with Sandy Pentland, Kent Larson, Steve Penrod, and Kevin Esvelt. The founding team included Abhishek Singh, Kristen Vilcans, Alina Clough, Francesco Maria Bendetti, Kaushal Jain, Khahlil Louisy, Sienna Leis, Greg Nadeau, Rachel Barbar, and John Werner.

On July 8, 2020, Ramesh Raskar, chairman of PathCheck Foundation, addressed the United States House of Representatives Committee on Financial Services Task Force on Artificial Intelligence during their hearing on "Exposure Notification and Contact Tracing: How AI Helps Localities Reopen Safely and Researchers Find a Cure", describing the use of contact tracing technologies used by PathCheck. He also spoke about PathCheck's surveillance and privacy methods at the Wall Street Journal Tech Health event.

Apps developed by PathCheck have been adopted by the governments of Minnesota, Hawaii, Guam, Puerto Rico, Teton County, Wyoming (home of Yellowstone National Park), and Cyprus.
