= Innovaccer =

Healthcare AI company

- Type: Private
- Industry: Health information technology; artificial intelligence
- Founded: 2014
- Founders: Abhinav Shashank, Kanav Hasija, Sandeep Gupta
- Headquarters: San Francisco, California, United States
- Products: Gravity; Atlas; Galaxy; Flow; Story Health; PQS; Humbi; Cured; Comet; Sara AI
- Website: innovaccer.com

Innovaccer Inc. is an American healthcare technology company. Innovaccer was founded in 2014 and is headquartered in San Francisco, California. The company offers an agentic AI platform that unifies clinical, operational, and financial data across health systems, payers, government health agencies, and life sciences organizations. It provides autonomous AI agents and AI-powered software across population health management, revenue cycle management, payer risk and quality, utilization management, patient engagement, and public sector health programs. By 2026, Innovaccer described its overarching strategy as "The Agentic Cloud for Healthcare."

The company was founded in 2014 with a stated mission to build the largest unified healthcare data infrastructure in the United States. It built data connectivity at scale, integrating EHR platforms including Epic, Cerner, Meditech, and Allscripts with payer claims feeds, pharmacy networks, lab systems, remote monitoring devices, and social determinants of health sources, assembling records for more than 80 million patients. The company also built applications that helped healthcare organizations act on that data. It has since shifted toward autonomous AI agents, responding to what trade coverage described as a structural labor shortage in healthcare: a widening gap between the clinical and administrative work that needs to be done and the workforce available to do it. In January 2025, Innovaccer raised a $275 million Series F, bringing total funding to $675 million at a valuation of about $3.45 billion.

Gravity is the company's cloud-agnostic data and AI platform, which serves as the foundation for the rest of the stack. Agents of Care is the company's family of AI agents. Atlas handles population health management, giving care teams a unified view of patient populations, surfacing care gaps, and coordinating interventions across chronic disease programs and value-based care contracts. Galaxy serves payers, helping them with risk adjustment, quality management, and utilization management across value-based and fee-for-service lines of business. The Flow line covers end-to-end revenue cycle automation including prior authorization, autonomous AI medical coding, clinical documentation, claims denial management, and collections. Cured, acquired in 2024, provides CRM, patient engagement, and digital marketing tools for health systems. Story Health, acquired in 2025, delivers virtual specialty care with a focus on cardiovascular disease management.

== History ==
=== 2014-2019 ===
Innovaccer was founded in 2014 by Abhinav Shashank, Kanav Hasija, and Sandeep Gupta. Reuters reported that the company's origins traced to an academic project associated with Harvard University and the Wharton School. The company's central premise was that fragmented patient data was the primary structural obstacle to improving healthcare outcomes and reducing costs. A single patient's medical history might be scattered across a dozen EHR systems, multiple insurance claims databases, a pharmacy benefit manager, independent labs, and remote monitoring devices, each siloed from the others. Early trade coverage described Innovaccer's work as building the connectivity to bridge those systems and reassemble the scattered pieces into coherent, longitudinal patient records.

The company built integrations across the major EHR platforms, Epic, Cerner, Meditech, Allscripts, and others, as well as payer claims feeds, pharmacy networks, lab data, social determinants of health sources, and remote patient monitoring systems. By 2025, the platform held records for more than 80 million patients, a scale the company cited as one of the largest unified healthcare data repositories in the United States.

=== 2020-2024 ===
Having established its data foundation, Innovaccer confronted a second problem: unified data, on its own, does not change outcomes. Healthcare organizations needed software that helped their teams act on what the data revealed, identifying patients at risk, closing care gaps, managing chronic disease populations, measuring quality, and navigating the administrative complexity of value-based care contracts. In response, Innovaccer built a suite of applications on top of its data platform covering population health management, care coordination, patient engagement, payer analytics, and quality reporting.

The application strategy attracted significant capital. In February 2021, Innovaccer raised $105 million in Series D financing, a round that pushed the company above a $1 billion valuation and made it a healthcare unicorn, according to business press coverage. In December 2021, Reuters reported a further $150 million raise led by Mubadala Capital, valuing the company at $3.2 billion. Both rounds funded the expansion of the application layer and the company's entry into new customer segments including health insurers, government health agencies, and life sciences companies.

The company also grew through acquisition. In January 2024, it acquired Cured, a healthcare CRM and digital marketing platform, adding more than 20 health system customers and expanding its reach into patient engagement. In March 2024, it acquired Pharmacy Quality Solutions (PQS), strengthening its capabilities in pharmacy quality reporting, medication adherence, and value-based reimbursement programs.

=== 2025-present ===
By 2025, a new challenge had come into focus. Even organizations with good data and capable software still lacked the human capacity to act at the scale those tools made possible. Healthcare's workforce shortages, documented widely in post-pandemic trade and policy coverage, meant that clinical staff were overwhelmed, administrative backlogs were growing, and the gap between what technology could surface and what teams could actually do was widening. Innovaccer's third phase was built around closing that gap: not just surfacing insights, but automating the work itself through AI agents that could handle multi-step clinical and administrative tasks with minimal human intervention.

In January 2025, Innovaccer raised a $275 million Series F. Fierce Healthcare reported that the company intended to use the capital to expand its AI capabilities and pursue a broader strategy as a "one-stop shop" for healthcare AI. TechCrunch put the post-money valuation at about $3.45 billion. Later that year, the company launched Gravity, an enterprise AI and data platform. According to the company, Gravity unifies enterprise-wide data and provides infrastructure for deploying AI agents across prior authorization, care management, clinical documentation, utilization management, medical coding, and contact-center operations. Acquisitions continued in parallel: Humbi AI, an actuarial analytics company, was acquired in January 2025, and Story Health, a virtual cardiovascular care company, followed in September 2025. Fierce Healthcare noted that the latter reflected a deliberate strategy to extend Innovaccer's reach beyond software and into care delivery itself.

== Products and strategy ==
=== Platform architecture ===
Gravity is a cloud-agnostic data and AI infrastructure layer built for healthcare enterprises. It launched in May 2025. Healthcare IT News described it as a data and AI platform built to accelerate AI adoption in healthcare. Gravity ingests and normalizes data from across an enterprise, including EHR systems, claims, pharmacy, labs, remote monitoring, and social determinants of health, and makes it available to the application and agent layers above it. The platform is built on partnerships with data infrastructure providers like Databricks and Snowflake, allowing health organizations to deploy it alongside their existing cloud environments rather than replacing them.

On top of the data layer sits a suite of domain-specific applications that allow organizations to manage patient populations, close care gaps, optimize payer risk and quality performance, automate revenue cycle workflows, engage patients, and deliver virtual specialty care.

The third layer is the agentic layer. The company offers autonomous AI agents across clinical, financial, and administrative workflows. The company also states that organizations can build custom AI agents on the Gravity platform. Together, the company has described this architecture as "The Agentic Cloud for Healthcare", a system designed to close the gap between what healthcare organizations know from their data and what their available workforce can realistically act on.

=== Acquisitions ===
Innovaccer has used acquisitions to extend its platform into areas where organic development would have taken longer, with each deal adding both capability and customers.

In January 2024, the company acquired Cured, a healthcare CRM and digital marketing platform. Fierce Healthcare and MedCity News reported that the transaction added more than 20 health system customers and expanded Innovaccer's reach into patient engagement and experience technology.

In March 2024, Innovaccer acquired Pharmacy Quality Solutions (PQS), a pharmacy-payer performance technology company strengthening its position in pharmacy quality reporting, medication adherence tracking, and value-based reimbursement programs.

Following the 2025 Series F, the pace of acquisitions accelerated. In January 2025, Innovaccer acquired Humbi AI, an actuarial software and analytics company, adding financial modeling capabilities for payer, provider, and life sciences customers. In September 2025, it acquired Story Health, a virtual specialty care company focused on cardiovascular disease. Fierce Healthcare described the Story Health deal as part of a deliberate post-fundraise strategy to extend Innovaccer's platform through acquisition into care delivery itself, not just the software that surrounds it.

Acquisitions
Company	Date	Notes
Cured	Jan 2024	Healthcare CRM and digital marketing platform. Added 20+ health system clients; reflected push into patient engagement.
Pharmacy Quality Solutions (PQS)	Mar 2024	Pharmacy-payer performance technology. Expanded presence in pharmacy quality reporting and value-based reimbursement.
Humbi AI	Jan 2025	Actuarial software, services, and analytics. Part of expansion into payer, provider, and life sciences use cases.
Story Health	Sep 2025	Virtual specialty care focused on cardiovascular disease management. Now operating as Story Health by Innovaccer.

== Partnerships and market expansion ==
Innovaccer expanded through a combination of technology infrastructure partnerships and public sector relationships. In 2025 and 2026, the company announced partnerships with Databricks and Snowflake. The partnerships centered on operationalizing AI models and agentic workflows to accelerate enterprise AI adoption. Innovaccer also announced a strategic partnership in January 2026, making Coforge their preferred implementation partner for its Gravity AI platform. Together, they launched G-Forge. a joint initiative and Healthcare AI Center of Excellence

In the public sector, Innovaccer expanded its presence in California government health programs. Trade coverage and company announcements cited work with San Mateo County Health and Alameda County Health on public health and social health data initiatives. The company also announced a strategic partnership with AMGA, the American Medical Group Association, aimed at improving integrated care delivery for medical groups nationwide.

== Recognition ==
In 2026, Innovaccer received Best in KLAS distinctions across multiple categories: Gravity in data and analytics for providers, Galaxy in data and analytics for payers, and Cured in customer relationship management. In the same year, PR Newswire reported that Innovaccer received a Frost & Sullivan new product innovation recognition for AI-driven patient access solutions.
