= COVID-19 Contact-Confirming Application =

Japanese COVID-19 app

COVID-19 Contact-Confirming Application; COCOA
- Original author: COVID-19 Radar Japan
- Developer: Ministry of Health, Labour and Welfare
- Release: June 19, 2020; 6 years ago
- Stable release: 1.4.1 / November 26, 2021; 4 years ago
- Written in: C#
- Operating system: Android 6.0 or later; iOS 13.5 or later
- Available in: 3 languages
- List of languages: Japanese; Chinese; English
- License: app: proprietary; source: MPL 2.0
- Website: www.mhlw.go.jp/stf/seisakunitsuite/bunya/cocoa_00138.html
- Repository: github.com/cocoa-mhlw/cocoa

COVID-19 Contact-Confirming Application (COCOA) is a COVID-19 application for smartphones provided by the Ministry of Health, Labour and Welfare of Japan. The application uses Bluetooth to detect and record suspected close contacts between users. If the contact is diagnosed with COVID-19, the user will be notified. After receiving the notification, the user can consider self-isolation or go to a medical institution for treatment.

== Development ==
On May 20, 2020, Apple and Google began to provide the public health authorities of various countries with the new coronavirus infection notification (English: Exposure Notification). On May 26, 2020, the "New Coronavirus Infectious Disease Countermeasures Technical Team" released a specification that defines the contact confirmation application and related systems that use this API. After Persol Process & Technology received the project management and maintenance order with a price of 41.04 million yen, it subcontracted it to two companies, including Microsoft Japan and Fixer. The application itself is developed by the open source community "COVID-19 Radar Japan" composed of private IT technicians. The members include Japanese Microsoft employees, and Persol Process & Technology is responsible for maintenance and adjustments. On June 15, the Nikkei reported that the application was developed by Microsoft in the United States, and Microsoft in Japan later denied the content of the report.

At 15:00 on June 19, 2020, Google Play and App Store began to provide the 1.0.0 (initial trial version) version of the application. This version does not link to the information control and management support system (HER-SYS) of people infected with the new coronavirus, and there are many problems. Version 1.1.1 (trial version) fixes the problems of the previous version, and after accessing the above system, it will be published to the App Store on June 30, 2020, and to Google Play on July 1, 2020. The Ministry of Health, Labour and Welfare stated that it will maintain the trial version for about one month after its release (June 19, 2020), revising the design and functions.

On September 13, 2022, Digital Minister Taro Kono said that COCOA will be discontinued as Tokyo continues to simply details on COVID-19 patients' names and other details.

=== COVID-19 Radar Japan ===
The initiator Hirose told Diamond Online that the plan was promoted by himself and 5 other core members, including Hirose, 4 core members agreed to open the name for an interview.

- Hirose Kazukai (the initiator of COVID-19 Radar Japan)
- Yasuda Kristina (External External person in charge)
- Noriko Matsumoto (designer in charge)
- Tetsuhiko Kodama (designer in charge)

== Function ==
=== Record contact information ===
As long as the smart phones of both parties are installed with COCOA and Bluetooths are turned on, the devices will record each other's data (identification code) and store it as "contact information". The contact information is an encrypted record, and personal identity cannot be identified. After 14 days of storage, the recorded information will be automatically delete. For privacy reasons, the application does not use personally identifiable information such as phone numbers and location information (GPS).

=== Notify when contact with confirmed cases ===
A confirmed case of COVID-19 confirmed by PCR testing will receive a "processing number" issued by the health center after the diagnosis is confirmed. After entering COCOA, people who have been in contact with the confirmed case will be notified. The Japanese government stated that the processing number of a confirmed case will only be sent to the confirmed case itself by mail, etc., to prevent abusers from falsely reporting the diagnosis.

== Issues ==
=== Can't find application issue ===
When it was released on June 19, 2020, the Ministry of Health, Labour and Welfare urged users to search for "contact confirmation app" (contact confirmation app) in the App Store and other places, and install it (download) for free. After the release, many people reported that they "cannot download" or "cannot search". The Ministry of Health, Labour and Welfare finally published the application link on its official website, and clicked it to go directly to the installation interface.

=== Confirmed information registration problem ===
In version 1.0.0 of the app, when registering confirmed information, even if the input processing number is not issued by the "New Coronavirus Infected Persons and Other Information Grasp and Management Support System", it will display "completed". After receiving the report, the Ministry of Health, Labour and Welfare stated that it is temporarily suspending the issuance of the processing number. Since the system will check the processing number, if the entered processing number has not been issued, it will not be registered as a confirmed case, and other users will not receive contact notifications. This problem has been fixed in version 1.1.1 of the application.

=== Starting day display problem ===
In version 1.0.0 of the application, the start date will be displayed as today's date. The 1.1.1 version of the application has fixed this problem.

=== Confirmed cases cannot be registered in the app issue ===
The Ministry of Health, Labour and Welfare stated that it will stop issuing the processing number required for registration information since July 11 due to "the discovery of a confirmed case of new coronavirus infection that could not be registered in the app". The revised version (1.1.2) will be released on iOS on July 13 and Android on July 14 to fix this problem.

=== Problem reporting method ===
The Tuberculosis and Infectious Diseases Division of the Ministry of Health, Labour and Welfare stated that if problems are found, they can report through the consultation email address listed in the app and Q&A, or go to the issue report discussion area (Issues) in the GitHub project.

== See also ==
- Protect each other
- Health Code
