= StaySafe.ph =

Philippine COVID-19 app

- Other names: Stay Safe
- Developer: MultiSys Technologies
- Release: September 3, 2020; 6 years ago
- Stable release: 3.0.10 (Android) 3.0.2 (iOS) / June 23, 2021 (Android) July 2, 2021 (iOS)
- Operating system: Android, iOS
- Size: 7.1MB (Android); 12.1 MB (iOS)
- Available in: English
- Website: www.staysafe.ph

StaySafe.ph or Stay Safe is a digital contact tracing app launched by the Philippine government as a response to the COVID-19 pandemic in the Philippines. The mobile app was developed and published by MultiSys Technologies Corporation.

== Development ==
StaySafe was developed by Multisys Technologies Corporation in collaboration with Smart and PLDT Enterprise and the Inter-Agency Task Force for the Management of Emerging Infectious Diseases (IATF-EID) and the National Task Force Against COVID-19.

StaySafe was launched by the Philippine government on September 3, 2020. The mobile app system was turned over to the government on March 3, 2021. The Department of the Interior and Local Government (DILG) holds ownership of StaySafe and it is supported by the Department of Health and the Department of Information and Communications Technology.

== Features ==
Users of the StaySafe app would need to get registered. There are plans to make other existing contact tracing apps used by local governments in Philippines to be interoperable with StaySafe. The app would also have the following features:

- Health condition reporting
- Social distancing system
- COVID-19 updates
- Contact tracing for real-time case management of local government units (LGUs)
- Establishment of protection system
- LGU heat map and response system
- Information dissemination for LGUs.

The mobile app makes use of Bluetooth system through the (Google/Apple) Exposure Notification (GAEN). StaySafe originally had a Global Positioning System (GPS) feature but had since been removed by MultiSys in January 2021 due to privacy concerns. Under GAEN users are notified if they have been in close contact with a user associated with a positive COVID-19 case.

Since March 2021, users are allowed to delete their own personal data and manual contact tracing data "shall be destroyed after a 60-day period" to comply with privacy-related requirements set by the National Privacy Commission.

MultiSys funds the operation of cloud services needed for the StaySafe system to function.

== Adoption ==
StaySafe was initially adopted by select local government units (LGUs), government agencies, and private companies. Resolution No 85 of the National Task Force Against COVID-19 dated November 26, 2021, mandated the usage of StaySafe app for anyone who need to enter national government or local government offices.

The Philippine National Police adopted StaySafe on April 14, 2021. The DILG targeted a nationwide rollout of the StaySafe system in May 2021.

DILG Secretary Eduardo Año issued Memorandum Circular 2021–075 on July 6, 2021, directing LGUs in the Philippines without a digital contact tracing system to adopt and use the StaySafe system in their areas of jurisdiction.
