= Thai Chana =

Thai COVID-19 app

- Website type: online registration system and closed database
- Available in: Thai
- Owner: Centre for COVID-19 Situation Administration
- Editors: Krungthai Bank and Digital Government Development Agency
- Commercial: no
- Registration: required
- Launched: 17 May 2020; 6 years ago
- Current status: Defunct since 1 October 2025

Thai Chana (Thai: ไทยชนะ, pronounced [tʰāj t͡ɕʰā.náʔ]; lit. 'Thais win') was an online registration system and closed database for public establishments to record their visitors as a government's plan to combat COVID-19 pandemic in Thailand. The database was available only to the Ministry of Public Health's Department of Disease Control in order to track, trace and restrict the visitors who may later be infected.

== Development ==
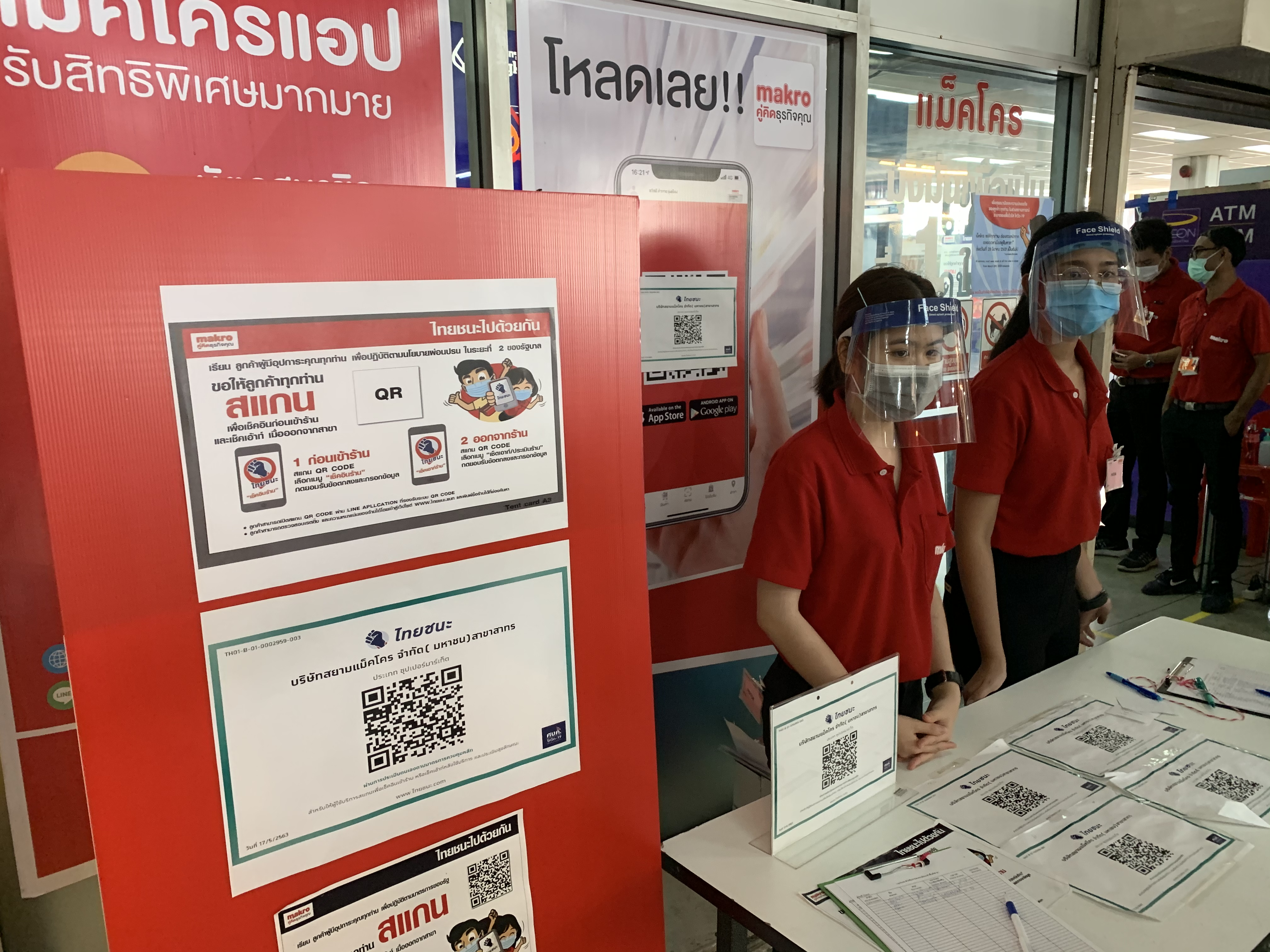
A Thai Chana checking-in station at the entrance of a store in Bangkok

Thai Chana was developed by Krungthai Bank and Digital Government Development Agency and was launched for public on 17 May 2020, following an order to reopen department stores after 2-month lockdown. Every enterprises are obliged to have their visitors "check-in" to the Thai Chana system upon arrival and "check-out" upon departure. As of February 2020, the system is available on its website and its Android mobile application. On its first day of operation, the system was deployed by more than 44,000 stores and was checked-in by more than 2 million users.

According to the official statement, goal of the system was to "determine the crowdedness of the given business location, so that the business owner can manage the visitors' admission" and to "trace the visitors [in case got infected] and track down those with close contact to them based on their check-ins". However, many found that these goals had never been implemented throughout the pandemic.

Department of Disease Control announced that the system was unavailable since 1 October 2025

== Criticisms ==
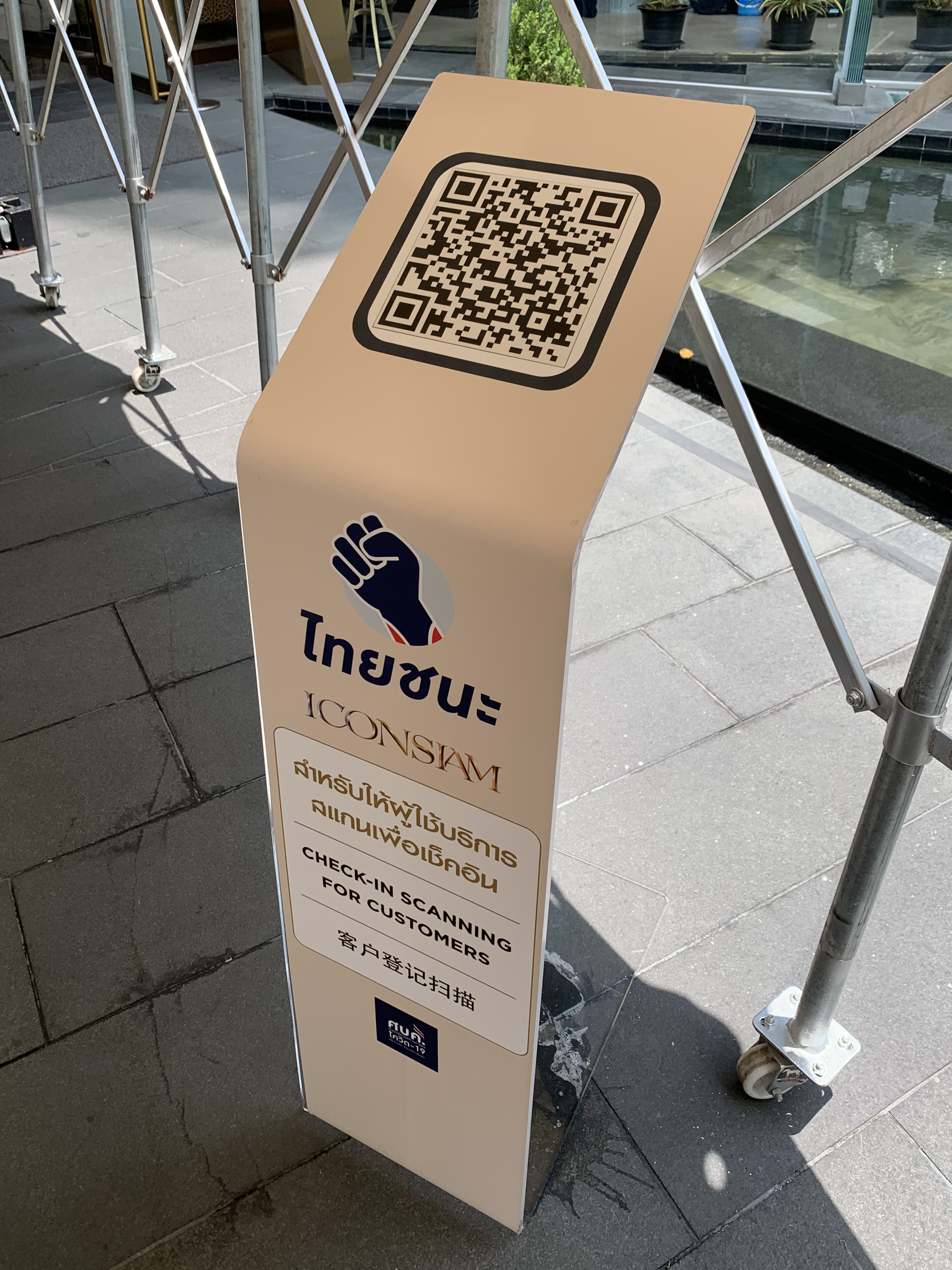
A Thai Chana scanning stand at an entrance of Iconsiam shopping centre in Bangkok

The system has been criticised for collecting certain aspects of users' private information that are deemed irreverent to the track-and-trace scheme and unnecessarily violating citizens' online privacy.

=== Privacy ===
Poramet Minsiri, founder of Kapook.com told BBC Thai that Thai Chana has made him realise that "[Thai] citizens' rights are so light". He further criticised the unnecessary collection of users' real-time location, amongst others, as a violation of online privacy. Human rights academics Sarueni Achawananthakun criticised its lack of transparency on data collection. She further questioned the extent of involvement of Krungthai Bank given its for-profit status.

=== Spam messages ===
Not long after Thai Chana launched, many iPhone and iOS users in Thailand received spam messages via iMessage advertising online casino scams. Many netizens accused the government's Thai Chana for possible leakage of many telephone numbers to third parties. However, Ministry of Digital Economy and Society declined all claims.
