= Carmela Troncoso =

Spanish telecommunication engineer (born 1982)

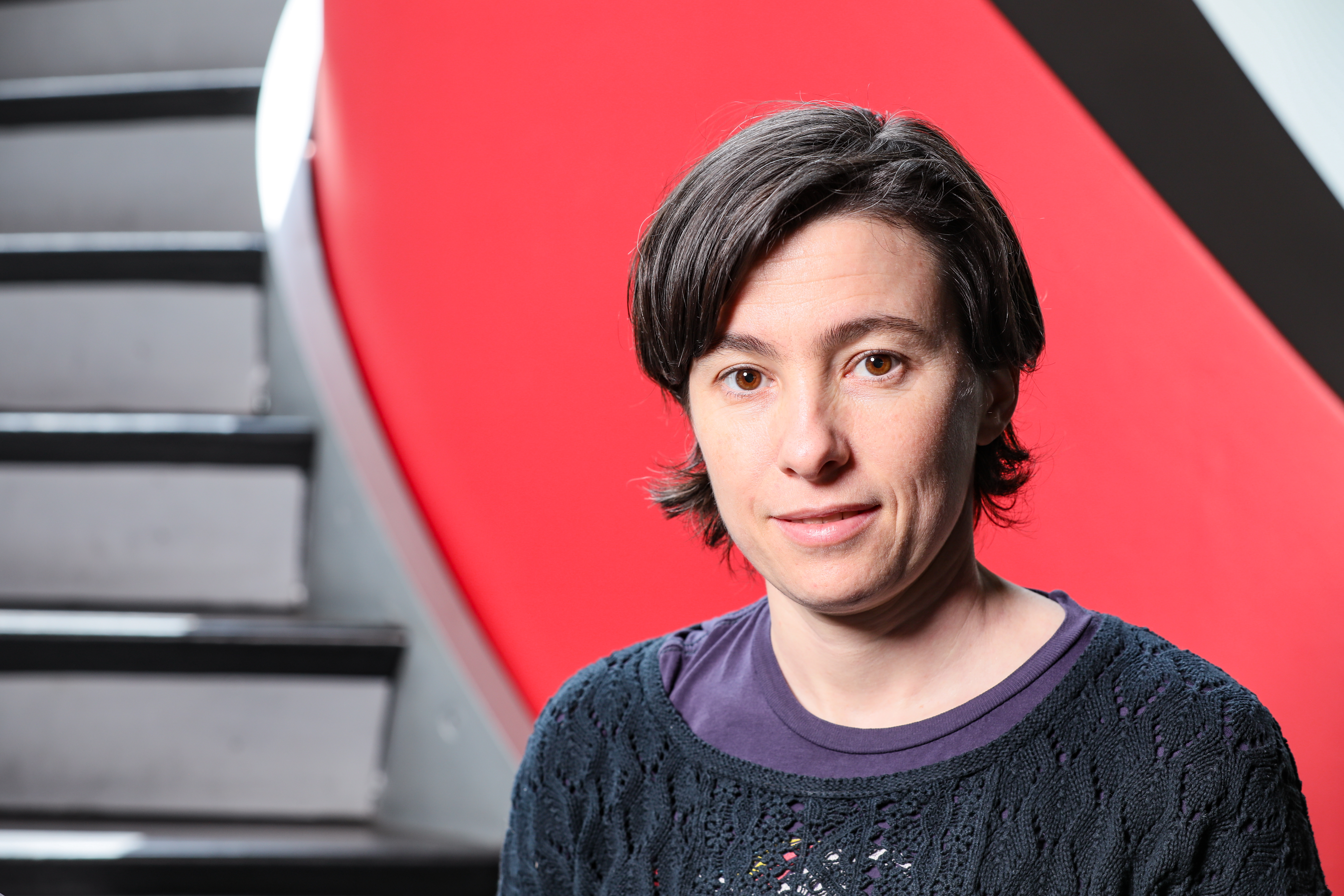
- Carmela Troncoso in 2020
- Born: 1982 (age 43–44); Vigo
- Citizenship: Spain
- Known for: DP-3T protocol
- Board member of: Swiss National COVID-19 Science Task Force
- Spouse: Rebekah Overdorf
- Awards: Google Security and Privacy Research Award; Fortune's 40und40 ERCIM WG STM Best Ph.D. Thesis Award (2011); CNIL-INRIA Privacy Protection Award 2017

Academic background
- Education: University of Vigo; KU Leuven

Academic work
- Discipline: Software engineering
- Sub-discipline: Computer security Machine learning
- Institutions: École Polytechnique Fédérale de Lausanne (EPFL)
- Main interests: Machine learning Privacy evaluation Engineering privacy-preserving systems
- Website: https://www.epfl.ch/labs/spring/

Carmela González Troncoso (born 1982 in Vigo) is a Spanish telecommunication engineer and researcher specialized in privacy issues, and an LGBT+ activist. She is currently a scientific director at the Max Planck Institute for Security and Privacy, on leave from École Polytechnique Fédérale de Lausanne (EPFL) in Switzerland. She is the head of the SPRING lab (Security and Privacy Engineering Laboratory). Troncoso gained recognition for her leadership of the European team developing the DP-3T protocol that aims at the creation of an application to facilitate the tracing of COVID-19 infected persons without compromising on the privacy of citizens. Currently she is also member of the Swiss National COVID-19 Science Task Force in the expert group on Digital Epidemiology. In 2020, she was listed among Fortune magazine's 40 Under 40.

== Career ==
Troncoso studied engineering at University of Vigo and in 2006 graduated in telecommunication engineering. She went to KU Leuven to work on her PhD on "Design and analysis methods for privacy technologies" under the supervision of Bart Preneel and Claudia Díaz. She continued at KU Leuven as a post-doc before joining Gradiant, the Galician Research and Development Center in Advanced Telecommunications, as a Security and Privacy Technical Lead. In October 2015 Troncoso joined the IMDEA Software Institute (Spain) as faculty member. Since November 2017 she has been a tenure track assistant professor at the SPRING lab (Security and Privacy Engineering Laboratory) at the School of Computer and Communication Sciences at École Polytechnique Fédérale de Lausanne (EPFL) in Switzerland.

== Research ==
Troncoso's research focuses on technologies enabling the development of socially responsible systems such as machine learning, privacy evaluation and privacy-preserving systems:

- Machine learning: Troncoso studies the impact of machine learning algorithms on daily activities of contemporary society, both the improvements as well as the disadvantages. Employing machine learning she builds tools helping to enhance system designs and find ethical designs defending against machine learning-based attacks on privacy.
- Privacy evaluation: Her lab performs research that helps user to authorize to better understand how much information they reveal, and to enable software developers to achieve their goals without endangering the privacy of users.
- Engineering privacy-preserving systems: Troncoso also works on developing frameworks assisting engineers to build privacy-preserving systems and methodologies that allow them to assess in a systematic way about the design and the evaluation of privacy-preserving technologies.

Based on her research, and together with International Consortium of Investigative Journalists (ICIJ) Troncoso developed the opensource collaborative data analysis tool Datashare. Datashare was used in the analysis of the Luanda Leaks.

== Covid-19 pandemic ==
In 2020, during the crisis of the Covid-19 pandemic, she leads a team of more than 30 people from eleven European institutions working to develop the DP-3T protocol under the umbrella of the Pan-European Privacy-Preserving Proximity Tracing (PEPP-PT) to create a computer application that tracks contacts and at the same time respects privacy with the aim of letting citizens know if they have been close to someone who days later tests positive for the virus. She is first author of white paper on the application of the DP-3T protocol. Google stated that it took inspiration from the DP-3T protocol.

Through her work the DP-3T protocol and on the SwissCovid app system during the Covid-19 Troncoso was featured in several Swiss and international news outlets. As an expert of the topic she also appeared on a number of panels and events such as the IMPACT2020 conference and the International Committee of the Red Cross' release of Data Protection Handbook for Humanitarian Action.

== Distinctions ==
In September 2020, Troncoso joined the ranks of "40 influential people" (40 Under 40) in the category technology nominated by the Fortune magazine.

Since 2020 Troncoso has been a member of the Swiss National COVID-19 Science Task Force, the scientific corona advisory board of the Swiss Federal Council and the cantons. She is a member of the expert group on Digital Epidemiology.

She is an awardee of the ERCIM WG STM Best Ph.D. Thesis Award (2011), the CNIL-INRIA Privacy Protection Award 2017 (Paper: Engineering privacy by design reloaded) and the Google Security and Privacy Research Award (2019).

== Selected works ==
- Shokri, Reza; Theodorakopoulos, George; Troncoso, Carmela; Hubaux, Jean-Pierre; Le Boudec, Jean-Yves (2012). "Protecting location privacy". Proceedings of the 2012 ACM conference on Computer and communications security - CCS '12 (PDF). p. 617. doi:10.1145/2382196.2382261. ISBN 9781450316514. S2CID 3418446.
- Gürses, S., Troncoso, C. and Diaz, C., 2011. Engineering privacy by design. Computers, Privacy & Data Protection, 14(3), p. 25. PDF.
- Troncoso, C.; Danezis, G.; Kosta, E.; Balasch, J.; Preneel, B. (2011). "PriPAYD: Privacy-Friendly Pay-As-You-Drive Insurance" (PDF). IEEE Transactions on Dependable and Secure Computing. 8 (5): 742–755. doi:10.1109/TDSC.2010.71.
- Shokri, Reza; Troncoso, Carmela; Diaz, Claudia; Freudiger, Julien; Hubaux, Jean-Pierre (2010). "Unraveling an old cloak". Proceedings of the 9th annual ACM workshop on Privacy in the electronic society - WPES '10 (PDF). p. 115. doi:10.1145/1866919.1866936. ISBN 9781450300964. S2CID 3714059.
- Balasch, J., Rial, A., Troncoso, C., Preneel, B., Verbauwhede, I. and Geuens, C., 2010, August. PrETP: Privacy-Preserving Electronic Toll Pricing. In USENIX security symposium (Vol. 10, pp. 63–78). PDF.
- Pyrgelis, A., Troncoso, C. and De Cristofaro, E., 2017. Knock knock, who's there? Membership inference on aggregate location data. arXiv preprint arXiv:1708.06145.
- Balsa, Ero; Troncoso, Carmela; Diaz, Claudia (2012). "OB-PWS: Obfuscation-Based Private Web Search". 2012 IEEE Symposium on Security and Privacy. pp. 491–505. doi:10.1109/SP.2012.36. ISBN 978-1-4673-1244-8. S2CID 3734059.
- Mittal, P., Olumofin, F.G., Troncoso, C., Borisov, N. and Goldberg, I., 2011, August. PIR-Tor: Scalable Anonymous Communication Using Private Information Retrieval. In USENIX Security Symposium (p. 31). PDF.
