= COVID-19 pandemic in Alberta =

Ongoing COVID-19 viral pandemic in Alberta, Canada

- Disease: COVID-19
- Pathogen: SARS-CoV-2
- Location: Alberta, Canada
- First outbreak: Wuhan, Hubei, China
- Index case: Calgary
- Arrival date: March 5, 2020 (6 years, 8 months, 2 weeks and 2 days)
- Date: June 15, 2022
- Confirmed cases: 586,108
- Deaths: 4,591
- Fatality rate: 0.78%

Government website
- Alberta Government

The COVID-19 pandemic in Alberta was part of the global COVID-19 pandemic. The province of Alberta had the third-most cases of COVID-19 in Canada, behind Ontario and Quebec.

Jason Kenney, the Premier of Alberta, working closely with the Emergency Management Cabinet Committee, followed the recommendations of Alberta's Chief Medical Officer of Health, Dr. Deena Hinshaw, in response to the "rapidly evolving global threat". A state of public health emergency was declared on March 17. Alberta's public health laboratory greatly increased tests for COVID-19, reaching 1,000 a day by March 8, and 3,000 a day by March 26. Hinshaw said that by March 20, "World-wide, Alberta has been conducting among the highest number of tests per capita." As of March 18, 2022, 6,905,190 tests have been conducted in Alberta. On June 12, the entire province of Alberta moved to Stage 2 of the government's economic relaunch plan.

The peak of the first wave was reached on April 30, 2020, when the number of active cases of COVID-19 in the province reached 3,022. By October 19, 2020, during the second wave, the number of active cases reached 3,138. This began a series of new record-high case numbers in Alberta, peaking on December 14, 2020, at 20,500 active cases. An attempt to lift restrictions after cases subsided in early-2021 was interrupted in March by a third wave, fuelled by variants of concern. This led to a rollback of the reopening process until the first vaccine dose was sufficiently distributed among residents. On July 1, Alberta lifted almost all remaining public health orders. In late July 2021, amid evidence of a fourth wave in Alberta, the province faced criticism for plans to treat COVID-19 as an endemic illness by scaling back testing, contact tracing, and self-isolation requirements.

Due to the fourth wave, the province began to reintroduce restrictions on September 4, including mandatory masks inside public indoor spaces. On September 15, 2021, Premier Kenney redeclared a public health emergency, announced the reinstatement of restrictions on businesses and gatherings, and announced a vaccine mandate for businesses, entities, and events that require exemptions to the public health orders.

== Government response ==
=== Mitigation measures ===
==== Initial response ====
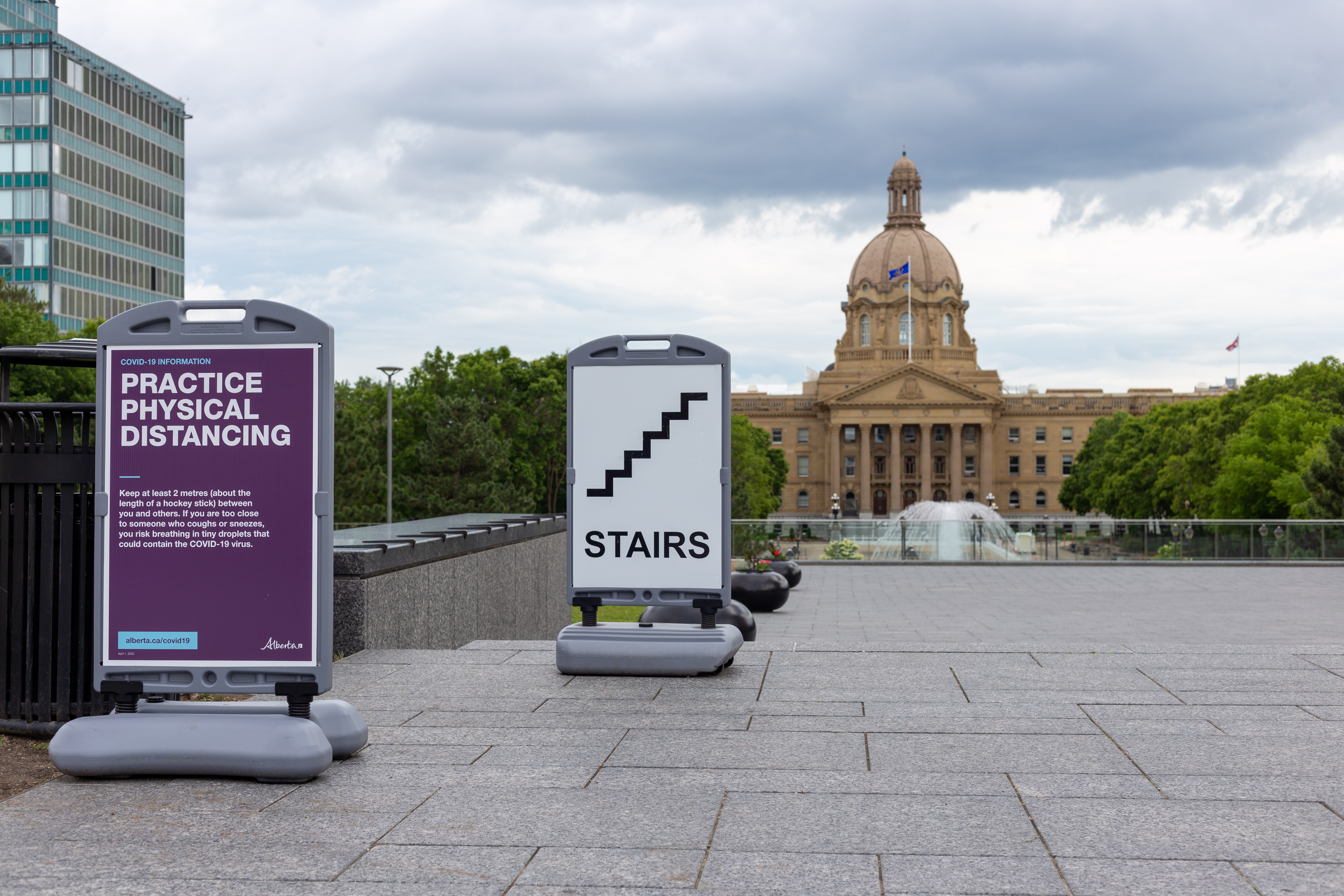
A sign enforcing social distancing in front of the Alberta Legislature Building.

On March 12, 2020, the province restricted all gatherings to a maximum of 250 people, recommended against international travel, and recommended that anyone returning from international travel self-isolate for 14 days on return. The Alberta Court of Queen's Bench postponed all jury trials scheduled to begin after March 13. Jury trials which were already in process, would continue.

Premier Kenney declared a public health emergency on March 17. The next day, he announced a series of provincial financial measures, including deferral of utility payments, ceasing of collection of corporate income taxes, a "six-month moratorium on student loans", and an emergency isolation support package.

On March 28, after having restricted them to 50 people, the province further limited gatherings to 15 people, suspended vehicle access to provincial parks, and ordered the closure of all "close-contact" health and personal care services, dine-in restaurants, and "non-essential" retail stores. Premier Kenney also announced protection for renters.

On April 23, Hinshaw announced that the restriction on gatherings of more than 15 people would persist through the summer. Hinshaw stated that although cases were trending downward, COVID-19 "spreads rapidly through social interactions", and it would be "with us for many months to come", and that they did not want to risk any further super-spreader events. The Calgary Stampede, K-Days, and a number of other provincial events were therefore cancelled, with the Stampede cancelled for the first time in nearly a century.

On April 30, the Alberta government announced a plan to lift restrictions in several phases. Some medical services and outdoor recreational activities reopen in early May, while daycare centres, restaurants and some retail outlets will reopen at reduced capacity on May 14. The timing of the next phase would depend on whether or not the first phase results in an increase in virus cases.

==== Second wave ====
Restrictions began to re-emerge in November 2020; on November 12, it was announced that for 14 days, bars would be required to end liquor sales by 10 p.m. and close by 11 p.m. within regions that were given an "enhanced status" classification by the AHS, and that all group fitness, group performance, and indoor team sports activity would be prohibited in the regions of Calgary, Edmonton, Fort McMurray, Grande Prairie, Lethbridge, and Red Deer.

On November 24, Kenney announced that all indoor "social gatherings" would be prohibited, residents may only be in close contact with members of their immediate household (or up to two people if living alone), and outdoor gatherings, weddings, and funerals would be limited to no more than 10 people. Students from grade 7 through 12 would shift to online classes from November 30 to January 11, 2021. In addition, event venues and indoor play spaces in enhanced status areas would be ordered closed, restaurants would be limited to tables of six with no entertainment allowed, casinos would be prohibited from operating table games, and retail businesses would be capped at a maximum of 25% of their licensed capacity. Kenney also encouraged businesses to allow remote work. It was stated that the measures would be evaluated and that by December 15, the province desired the rate of new transmissions to fall to 1%.

On December 8, Premier Kenney announced a new series of health orders. All social gatherings were prohibited, and face masks must be worn province-wide in any indoor public space. Effective December 13, all in-person restaurants, bars, casinos and gaming facilities, indoor entertainment and recreation facilities, fitness centres, personal care facilities, art galleries, libraries, museums, and arenas were ordered closed. Remote work was required by all employees unless their physical presence was considered necessary for their respective jobs, and all retail businesses and religious gatherings were limited to 15% of the venue's licensed capacity. These measures would remain in effect for at least four weeks. Kenney stated that he did not want to order the closure of all retail businesses, considering such a measure to have been disproportionately advantageous to "big U.S.-owned big-box stores" and detrimental to smaller, Alberta-owned businesses.

On December 22, Premier Kenney announced a one-time exemption to the province's gathering restrictions for the holiday season, allowing people who live alone to visit another household once between December 23 and 28. On January 7, 2021, Premier Kenney announced that the existing measures would be extended for at least two more weeks.

On January 18, the province began to allow outdoor public gatherings of up to 20 people, and personal care services to reopen for one-on-one appointments. On January 21, the remaining restrictions were extended for an indefinite period, with Hinshaw stating that Alberta needed to "give it a bit more time" and focus on "how we all collectively work together to keep those numbers coming down."

==== "The Path Forward" ====
On January 29, 2021, Premier Kenney announced that restrictions would begin to be eased on February 8 via a framework known as "The Path Forward"; it defines key metrics which would allow restrictions to be eased incrementally, over several steps. Among these benchmark metrics were upper limits on hospitalized COVID cases, and a minimum wait period of three weeks between each step, in order to assess impact and ensure that the healthcare system would not be overwhelmed.

On March 1, Premier Kenney announced that Alberta would begin to phase in "Step 2", allowing for low-intensity group fitness classes to resume. The remainder of Phase 2 was implemented March 8, which included the ability for libraries to reopen (limited to 15% capacity), retail to operate at 25% capacity, banquet and conference halls to open for allowed activities, and collegiate sports programs allowed to conduct practices with 10 participants per group, with three metres of social distancing between them and masks mandatory (games are prohibited).

On March 22, due to a major surge of cases brought upon by variants of concern, Health Minister Tyler Shandro stated that the province had no plans to move to "Step 3" at that time, explaining that "moving to Step 3 can be considered only when hospitalizations for COVID patients are under 300 and declining. Hospitalizations must be on a clear downward trajectory if we are to enter any new step, just like they were when we entered Step 1 and Step 2 earlier this year."

==== Return to Step 1 ====
On April 6, Premier Kenney announced that Alberta would be rolled back to Step 1 effective 11:59 p.m. MT until further notice; in addition, beginning April 9 restaurants were prohibited from offering indoor dining, but could still offer outdoor dining. On April 29, Premier Kenney announced a series of "targeted health measures" applying in regions with at least 250 active cases and more than 350 active cases per-100,000; schools must close to in-person classes, indoor gyms must close, and all indoor sports activity must be suspended. These orders would apply for two weeks, even if incidence rates fall below the threshold during the period. Kenney indicated that curfews may be implemented at the request of local officials or if active cases exceed 1,000 per 100,000.

==== Third wave ====
On May 4, Premier Kenney announced new restrictions; province-wide, all schools and post-secondary institutions were moved to online classes from May 7 to at least May 25, all in-person dining at restaurants was prohibited beginning May 10, and all indoor recreation activities were prohibited. In regions with at least 50 active cases per 100,000, gatherings were further limited to 5 people, personal care services were ordered closed, retail stores were limited to 10% capacity, outdoor recreation with individuals from outside of the immediate household was prohibited, and any non-critical business that is the subject of a COVID-19 outbreak will be ordered closed for 10 days. Hinshaw later stated that the move to close schools was an "operational decision" due to community transmission impacting staffing.

==== "Open for Summer Plan" ====
Alberta's "Open for Summer Plan", which was announced on May 25 with some measures implemented on June 1 and all public health restrictions lifted by July 1, was directly responsible for a September spike in preventable COVID-19 cases, according to Dr. Deena Hinshaw, Alberta chief medical officer of health. Hinshaw accepted responsibility for the "narrative" in July that the pandemic was over. By October, the Open for Summer plan was described as a "failure" and a "cautionary tale" for other Canadian provinces as the number of delta cases climbed. Even with the number of cases increasing, Kenney had refused to impose vaccine passports. Mask mandates were lifted. Plans were in place to "abandon test, trace and isolate protocols." As the number of cases and hospitalizations steadily climbed throughout the summer, Hinshaw and Kenny failed to reimpose public health measures. Kenney's poorly thought out policy decisions, his slow response to increasing cases and hospitalizations, combined with Albertans comparatively low vaccination rates became a "recipe for disaster". Ontario with a much larger population but with restrictions in place, fared much better.

School students returned to in-person classes on May 25 following the Victoria Day holiday. On May 26, Premier Kenney announced the replacement of "The Path Forward" with the "Open for Summer Plan", a new framework that would be based on vaccination progress and hospitalization metrics. On June 18, 2021, at a media event in Edmonton, Premier Kenney announced per the Plan that Step 3 would be implemented on July 1, as the province had met the 70% threshold of first doses.

Stage	Prerequisites	Date implemented	Restrictions
Step 1	At least two weeks have passed since the following metrics have been met: At least 50% of eligible residents have received at least one vaccine dose.; Province-wide hospitalizations are below 800.	June 1, 2021	Outdoor gatherings capped at 10 people with social distancing.; Outdoor recreation activities are permitted for individuals or groups of 10 people or fewer.; All indoor social gatherings are prohibited.; All employees must remote work if they have the capability to do so.; Retail stores are limited to 15% capacity.; Places of worship may operate at 15% capacity.; Personal care services must operate by appointment only; Wedding ceremonies capped at 10 people.; Funeral services are capped at 20 people.; Wedding and funeral receptions prohibited; Restaurants limited to outdoor/patio service, maximum four people per table, restricted to members or immediate household or designated close contacts for those who live alone.
Step 2	At least two weeks have passed since the following metrics have been met: At least 60% of eligible residents have received at least one vaccine dose.; Province-wide hospitalizations are below 500 and decreasing.	June 10, 2021	Outdoor social gatherings capped at 20 people with social distancing.; Outdoor public gatherings capped at 150 people or one-third capacity for "outdoor fixed seating facilities".; All indoor social gatherings are prohibited.; Remote work was recommended wherever possible, but this is no longer a mandate.; Restaurants may offer indoor dining, a maximum of six people per table.; Post-secondary students return to in-person classes.; Retail stores and places of worship may operate at one-third of their capacity.; Indoor recreation and entertainment facilities may operate at 30% capacity.; Wedding ceremonies and funeral ceremonies are capped at 20 people. Outdoor receptions are allowed.; Youth and adult sports may resume without restrictions.
Step 3	At least two weeks have passed since the following metrics have been met: At least 70% of eligible residents have received at least one vaccine dose.	July 1, 2021	Most remaining restrictions lifted.; Masks remain mandatory on public transport and in health care settings.

On July 28, Alberta announced major changes to its handling of COVID-19 (amended August 13) in order to place it "in line with other respiratory viruses to ensure health system capacity for the fall", which included plans to scale back asymptomatic testing, and eventually lift self-isolation requirements for those who test positive.

==== Fourth wave ====
During the fourth wave, from July 11, 2021, until November 16 there were 903 COVID-19 deaths. At its peak in mid-September, 2021 the new daily case counts were over 1,600, the number of hospitalizations was over 1,130, and the total number of active cases exceeded 20,000 for the first time since the pandemic began. By September 20, the number of active cases was much more than twice as many as any other province or territory. For the month of August, while Kenney was on vacation overseas, the mask mandate had not been re-instated and no changes were made to the restrictions guidelines. When he returned to Alberta in early September, ICUs had 10 times more COVID patients compared to early August. According to Maclean's magazine, patients were double-bunked in hospitals and overflow rooms were being used. Hospital staff had to be brought in through the military and the Red Cross. Thousands of surgeries had to be cancelled including those for cancer patients and children. Daily COVID fatalities reached heights not seen since last winter when unvaccinated residents of senior homes died from the virus.

For the month of August, while Premier Kenney was on vacation overseas, no changes were made to the restrictions guidelines. On September 4, 2021, masks once again became mandatory within public indoor spaces province-wide. Licensed establishments are also prohibited from serving alcohol after 10:00 p.m. nightly, and consumption must end after 11:00 p.m.

On September 15, 2021, Premier Kenney reinstated the public health emergency and announced new restrictions that took effect beginning September 16 and September 20;

- Effective September 16
  - All employees must remote work unless their physical presence is necessary for their position.
  - Outdoor private social gatherings are capped at 200 people with social distancing.
  - Private indoor gatherings are capped at 10 fully vaccinated people 12 and older from a maximum of two households. No limit on the number of household members younger than 12.
  - Unvaccinated individuals who are eligible for vaccination may not attend indoor social gatherings unless they are vaccinated.
  - Outdoor events are subject to social distancing.
  - Places of worship may operate at one-third capacity with social distancing.
  - Masks are mandatory at schools (for students grade 4 and up, and for all staff and faculty) and places of worship.
- Effective September 20
  - Restaurants and food courts may not offer indoor dining. Outdoor dining is limited to a maximum of six people per table. Subject to alcohol curfew.
  - All retail, entertainment, and recreation facilities must operate at one-third capacity. Groups must be limited to immediate households or up to two designated close contacts for those who live alone.
  - Indoor weddings and funerals are capped at 50 guests or 50% capacity. Indoor receptions are prohibited. Subject to alcohol curfew.
  - Indoor group fitness, recreation, or sports activities for adults are prohibited.
  - Restrictions Exemption Program: eligible operations and discretionary events are exempted from public health orders if all patrons over the age of 12 are required to present proof of vaccination for COVID-19, proof that they have tested negative on a privately paid COVID-19 test within the past 72 hours, or documentation issued by a physician or nurse practitioner of a valid medical reason for not being vaccinated.
    - Eligible operations include indoor entertainment, event, and recreation facilities, restaurants, bars, nightclubs, and adult sport, fitness and performance activities.
    - Initially, patrons must present proof of at least one dose. As of October 25, patrons must be fully vaccinated.
    - Vaccination requirements do not apply to individuals (such as employees) who are on-site for work-related purposes.
    - Any operations "that need[s] to be accessed by the public for daily living", or otherwise considered "out-of-scope operators" are ineligible to participate in the Restrictions Exemption Program. They include:
      - Retail outlets
      - First Nations colleges
      - Health, personal, and wellness services
      - Hotels and accommodations
      - K-12 schools and curriculum-based activities
      - Libraries
      - Places of worship
      - Private gatherings
      - Publicly funded post-secondary institutions (which are subject to separate guidelines)

On September 22, 2021, the city of Calgary passed a by-law mandating participation in the Restrictions Exemption Program by all facilities and events that are eligible to do so.

==== Fifth wave ====
From November 17 until March 5, there were 767 deaths by COVID. At its peak on January 13, there were 62,733 active cases in Alberta which represented the highest number reached during the pandemic.

On December 10, 2021, Kenney left open the possibility that restrictions on gatherings may be eased for the holiday season.

However, due to concerns surrounding Omicron variant, Kenney announced on December 21 mandatory masks at all times, and new restrictions affecting bars and restaurants and large venues of over 1,000, such as limiting the latter to 500 clients and the former to ten people per table and a slightly earlier last call for alcohol and closing time.

In early January 2022, with the Omicron-driven fifth wave rising and healthcare capacity already "spread too thin" federal Health Minister Jean-Yves Duclos, suggested mandatory vaccination as an option that provinces and territories might consider. Kenney responded almost immediately that Alberta would not introduce a mandate. By January 10, there were 635 hospitalizations with COVID and 72 people in the ICU.

Because of the highly virulent nature of the Omicron variant, by January 10, 2022, the CMOH announced that AHS had reached its capacity for PCR testing and was immediately limiting PCR testing to those with a high risk of severe outcomes. While the official number of active reported cases was 57,332, the actual number was much higher because the positivity rate of 38% was so high and PCR testing was rationed.

On January 13, Kenney announced that the thousand of rapid tests that the Education Minister Adriana LaGrange has promised to schools along with medical-grade masks, were delayed.

==== End of public health measures ====
On February 8, 2022, Kenney announced that the province would begin to ease its Omicron-related restrictions, stating that "We cannot remain at a heightened state of emergency forever. We have to begin to heal, and so Alberta will move on. But we'll do so carefully, we'll do so prudently, we will do so only if it does not threaten the capacity of our healthcare system." These restrictions will be eased in multiple steps.

- Restrictions Exemption Program was discontinued effective at midnight on February 9, 2022. The existing capacity restrictions for facilities with a fire code capacity above 500 remain in force, but attendees may consume food and drink at arenas when seated. All other existing restrictions remain in force
- Mask mandates at schools and for children 12 and younger ended on February 14
- On March 1, the mask mandate, and all other capacity restrictions, gathering restrictions, and remote work requirements expired.
- In the next step, any remaining provincial health orders on the self-isolation of positive cases and COVID-specific continuing care measures will be removed. The date for this further easing of measures is to be determined.

The Municipal Government Act was amended to prohibit any COVID-19 mask or vaccine mandates at the municipal level without the permission and authorization of the minister of municipal affairs.

On April 26, 2022, Court of Queen's Bench Justice Barbara Romaine ruled that certain details pertaining to discussions between Deena Hinshaw and the provincial Cabinet of Alberta would be made public, citing the importance of the question brought by the plaintiffs of constitutionality of specific public health orders. On May 9, 2022, the organizer of a protest outside Calgary City Hall in December 2020 was acquitted of a charge for holding a prohibited "private social gathering", with provincial judge Michael Dinkel ruling that it did not constitute a private gathering because members of the public were invited to attend.

In October 2022, Danielle Smith was sworn in as premier of Alberta to replace the outgoing Jason Kenney. She established a stance against any future COVID-19 measures, and argued that "unvaccinated" people should be protected under the province's Human Rights Act. She stated that they had "faced the most restrictions on their freedoms in the last year", and that "we are not going to create a segregated society on the basis of a medical choice". Smith received criticism for the remarks (including stating that unvaccinated people were "the most discriminated against group that I’ve ever witnessed in my lifetime"), arguing that they were divisive and trivialized the discrimination faced by minority groups. In response, Smith stated that she did not mean to "create any false equivalencies to the terrible historical discrimination and persecution suffered by so many minority groups over the last decades and centuries", but refused to specifically apologize.

In December 2025, the Alberta government quietly eliminated its public reporting dashboard of COVID-19 outbreaks in acute care facilities, saying the province is under no legal obligation to continue publishing the data in a "post-pandemic context."

=== Face masks ===
On May 29, 2020, the Alberta government announced partnerships with fast food chains A&W, McDonald's, and Tim Hortons to distribute complimentary non-medical face masks to drive-thru customers.

On August 1, 2020, Calgary and Edmonton both mandated the wearing of masks in indoor public spaces. Banff also required masks in its downtown pedestrian area. By November 20, 2020, Alberta was the only province without a provincial mask mandate. A mask mandate was announced on December 8, 2020.

=== Schools ===
Premier Kenney announced school closures on March 15. All daycares were closed. Classes were suspended for K-12 schools but schools were not closed. According to a March 20 Alberta Teachers Association notification, teachers were still required to work, either from home if the school board permits, or in their schools. Post-secondary institutions switched to online classes and all in-person classes were suspended. With schools and daycares closed, and parents needing childcare, a hundred University of Alberta medical students offered to provide childcare to doctors and other frontline health care workers.

By the evening of March 12, the University of Calgary notified students that it was suspending lectures effective the following day. Effective April 2, access to any campus facilities was closed off, except for electronic/keycard access to authorized staff and students.

By March 21, the University of Alberta notified students living on campus that they had to leave their residences by March 24, with exemptions for "international students and people from out of province or in isolation." In Calgary, the Southern Alberta Institute of Technology told students they had until March 23 to leave.

In July 2020, it was announced that schools would resume in-person classes in September with enhanced safety protocols, and a $120 million increase in funding for the province's school boards to cover the cost of these measures. Premier Kenney stated that "the overwhelming evidence is that schools can be operated safely with little health risk for children and teachers and low risk of causing serious outbreaks in the communities that surround them."

On September 16, 2021, due to the declaration of a public health emergency, all post-secondary institutions in Calgary and Edmonton announced that in-person classes would be suspended until September 20 and resume for fully-vaccinated students only, as mandatory social distancing is not possible, and the Restrictions Exemption Program (vaccine mandate) does not take effect until September 20.

=== ABTraceTogether ===
On May 1, the province released a digital encounter logging app, ABTraceTogether—developed by Deloitte and based on the BlueTrace protocol and Singapore's TraceTogether app—which generates random IDs transmitted via Bluetooth and logged by the app on other users' phones. If a user tests were positive, their ID can be flagged by the system and other users notified, which can help to speed up initial contact tracing. Officials stated that the app was the first of its kind to be deployed within North America.

iOS limitations prevent ABTraceTogether from running in the background on iPhone, and thus require it to be open and in the foreground in order to operate. This limitation does not impact the Android version, which is able to run in the background. Alberta NDP critic for democracy and ethics Heather Sweet displayed concern for the limitation and privacy implications tied to it, arguing that "when you're keeping your device open at all times when you're using it, the question becomes, how is that data being stored if you're collected it from somebody else and how is it being used?"

On July 31, 2020, the Canadian federal government launched COVID Alert, which is based on Apple Inc. and Google's Exposure Notification system. It operates in a similar manner to ABTraceTogether, using APIs implemented at the OS level on both Android and iOS to overcome the aforementioned limitations on background operation. It also does not require the provision of personally-identifiable information to use. In August 2020, the Alberta government reported that it wanted to shift ABTraceTogether to Exposure Notification to create interoperability with COVID Alert, but alleged that the federal government was preventing them from releasing updates to the iOS version due to Apple's partnership with it. It was later announced that Alberta would adopt and migrate users to COVID Alert.

By October 2020, COVID Alert had been adopted in all provinces except Alberta and British Columbia. Alberta stated that it needed to ensure all existing 247,000 ABTraceTogether accounts could be "transitioned" to COVID Alert. Mayor of Calgary Naheed Nenshi called upon the provincial government to adopt the app, citing the limitations of ABTraceTogether, and warning against the "politicization of public health"—in reference to members of the majority United Conservative Party having recently heckled COVID Alert as "Trudeau's app" during Question Period. In an October 30 interview with 630 CHED, Prime Minister Justin Trudeau called upon Premier Kenney to adopt COVID Alert, and stated that Alberta residents could still download the app to receive exposure notifications from out-of-province users (although Alberta users cannot report their own COVID positives to the app unless it is adopted by Alberta Health Services).

On November 6, 2020, Premier Kenney stated that Alberta would not adopt COVID Alert, stating that the province would no longer be able to operate ABTraceTogether if it did, and argued that ABTraceTogether was "from our view, simply a better and more effective public health tool".

On October 7, 2021, CBC News reported, based on a freedom of information request, that only 158 users of ABTraceTogether had actually reported their positive COVID-19 test through the app to date, resulting in notifications of around 1,500 potential contacts. It was projected that by the end of the year, Alberta would have spent $1.7 million and $2.6 million respectively on contracts with Deloitte and IBM to maintain the app.

=== Testing ===
By March 8, Alberta's public health laboratory was performing 1,000 tests a day and by March 26, they were conducting 3,000 tests a day. The total number of tests performed reached 20,165 by March 20, which represented among the "highest number of tests per capita" in the world. As of April 21, 109,015 tests had been conducted and 3,095 cases were confirmed.

On March 24, following the example of other Canadian provinces, the AHS shifted priorities towards testing "groups at highest risk of local exposure". Under the new guidelines, "travellers who returned to Alberta after March 12" with mild symptoms would no longer be tested for COVID-19. Under the new testing protocol, there are four groups of people who will have priority for testing: those who "are hospitalized with respiratory illness"; "residents of continuing care and other similar facilities"; people "who returned from travelling abroad between March 8 and March 12"; and "health-care workers with respiratory symptoms." Hinshaw said, "Our new approach reflects the fact that the most important thing anyone can do if they have mild symptoms isn't to get tested – it's to stay home and self-isolate."

Health Link nurses had been referring people with COVID-19 symptoms to one of a number of drive-thru assessment centres for testing.

=== Travel and entry restrictions ===
Under federal travel restrictions implemented March 18, 2020, Calgary International Airport is one of only four Canadian airports currently accepting international flights from outside the Caribbean, Mexico, and the United States. Travellers arriving at Calgary international arrival gates are met with Alberta health officials who are "reinforcing a message of mandatory" 14 days self-isolation to returning travelers.

On October 22, 2020, the government of Alberta announced a pilot project with the federal government, whereby individuals returning from international travel via Calgary International Airport or the Sweetgrass–Coutts Border Crossing may waive the federally mandated quarantine period if they are immediately tested for COVID-19 on arrival. They must quarantine until the result comes back negative, after which they are no longer restricted, although they must receive a second test within six or seven days of arrival, complete a daily assessment survey, and not travel out of province for 14 days. By December 2020, it was reported that at least 10,000 travelers had opted into the scheme, and that the positivity rate was "quite low".

== Economic impact ==
On March 14, the chief economist of Alberta Central, a banking facility for the province's credit unions, said that because of the pandemic and the low oil price, they expect that the provincial economy will contract by 1.5% in 2020, with 25,000 jobs lost.

== Other reactions ==
=== Sports ===
The National Hockey League season was suspended, affecting the Calgary Flames and Edmonton Oilers. The Western Hockey League and Canadian Hockey League scrapped the remainder of its season on March 23.

In July 2020, the NHL announced that Rogers Place in Edmonton would be one of two host arenas of the 2020 Stanley Cup playoffs beginning August 1 (alongside Toronto's Scotiabank Arena), which were played behind closed doors with all participating teams staying within a restricted bio-secure bubble encompassing the arena and nearby facilities such as hotels. Rogers Centre had been considered a front-runner prior to the announcement due to its high-quality facilities and ease of access to nearby hotels and facilities, while the league eventually focused on Canadian cities due to the spike of new cases in the United States.

Alberta subsequently hosted bio-secure bubbles for several other continental and international sporting events, including:

- 2021 World Junior Ice Hockey Championships in Edmonton; the tournament was originally to be co-hosted by Edmonton and Red Deer.
  - The two cities were to host the 2022 World Junior Ice Hockey Championships as compensation, but it was hampered by Omicron variant restrictions, and games being cancelled due to IIHF COVID-19 rules. The tournament was scrapped and replayed in August 2022 at Rogers Place.
- All Curling Canada national championships for the 2020–21 season were moved behind closed doors to a bio-secure bubble at Canada Olympic Park in Calgary, branded as Curling's Capital. This included the Scotties Tournament of Hearts, Tim Hortons Brier, and both the World Men's and World Women's curling championships. The Grand Slam of Curling also hosted the Champions Cup and Players' Championship in the bubble.
  - The 2021 World Women's Curling Championship was rescheduled and added to the bubble after the event, originally to be hosted by Schaffhausen, Switzerland was cancelled in February. A COVID-19 outbreak occurred amongst broadcasting staff during the World Women's championship, resulting in a number of matches not being televised.
- The Professional Women's Hockey Players Association (PWHPA) hosted the Canadian leg of its 2021 Dream Gap Tour from May 24–30, 2021 in Calgary.
- The 2021 IIHF Women's World Championship was postponed and moved from Halifax, Nova Scotia to Calgary. All games were played behind closed doors.

Hockey Alberta cancelled the remainder of the 2020-21 minor hockey season on February 2, 2021, citing uncertainties over the requirements for Alberta's four-step reopening.

== Transmission ==
Virus transmission can be travel-related, close contact cases or can be community-transmitted. By March 31, there were 286 cases known to have been spread through travel. Hinshaw reported in the last week in March that returning travellers were obligated to self-quarantine for 14 days. The province shifted testing priorities and was no longer testing returned travellers, so this number is not expected to rise. By the end of March there were 297 cases that had been "spread through close contact with an infected individual or object."

About 72 people attended a curling bonspiel held at the Granite Curling Club in Edmonton from March 11 to 14 and by March 27 at least 24 medical professionals who participated had tested positive for COVID-19. Health officials believe that a doctor from Saskatchewan who had been to Las Vegas before attending the Edmonton event was the bonspiel's patient zero. There was a banquet at the event, and health officials suspect that serving spoons, which many people handled, were the source of spreading the virus.

By March 25, 34 cases were linked to a "super spreader" event, a March 6 prayer meeting held at a private home in Calgary's Upper Northwest zone, with a pastor from Singapore as the featured guest. Jason Kenney's polling numbers plummeted in the last few months of 2020.

=== Community transmission ===
Community transmission refers to cases where Alberta Health Service (AHS) investigators "could not identify an obvious source of the virus." Alberta's first case of community transmission was announced on March 15, and by March 26 there were 34 cases of the virus, suspected to have been spread by community transmission.

By March 31 the number of community-transmitted cases had increased to 75 which was double the number from the previous week. The number of community-transmitted cases serves as a significant indicator of the success or failure of social distancing.

=== Outbreaks ===
By March 30, 2020, there were 36 residents of the McKenzie Towne care home and five staff members that were "probable or confirmed cases". By March 31, Alberta Health was also tracking outbreaks in Calgary's Carewest Glenmore Park Centre and Shepherd's Care Kensington in the Edmonton Zone. Hinshaw described these outbreaks as "worrisome".

On April 15, 2020, multiple cases tied to the Kearl Oil Sands Project were announced, reaching 20 by April 20. This prompted advisories from health authorities in British Columbia and Saskatchewan. A major outbreak of cases in northwest Saskatchewan (centered upon the remote community of La Loche) was attributed to cases imported from Kearl.

The town of High River had 164 cases and one death as of April 17, 2020, with some of the patients being employees of the Cargill meat packing plant. The plant continued at a reduced capacity, but no layoffs had occurred as of April 17. As of April 17, there were 358 cases linked to the plant, accounting for 15% of the province's cases. United Food and Commercial Workers Canada Union Local 401 lobbied unsuccessfully for the plant's closure since the point at which health authorities were aware of 38 cases linked to the facility. On April 20, Cargill temporarily closed the facility after a total of 484 cases were confirmed.

In July 2020, an outbreak emerged in Warner, Alberta—a U.S. border region which had, up until then, had no confirmed cases. On July 3, the number of active cases had increased to 39. The government stated that these cases were "all linked to known sources and stem largely from a small number of gatherings in large families or social groups." The AHS also stated that it was investigating a possible link between the outbreak to a recent funeral held by a nearby Hutterite colony. Officials in Saskatchewan had been working with Alberta to investigate whether interprovincial travel may have led to an outbreak at Hutterite colonies in southwestern Saskatchewan.

== Statistics ==
=== 2020 cases ===
View source data.

=== 2021 cases ===
View source data.

=== 2022 cases ===
View source data.

=== Cases over time ===
View source data.

=== Geographic distribution of cases ===
The Alberta government maintains a geospatial tracker, which provides more specific geographic data, such as active cases per city region, city, or county.

Regional data as of May 30, 2022
Health zone	Confirmed cases (Note: Cumulative total of presumptive and confirmed cases.)	Deaths	Percent of cases
Calgary zone	237,360	1,289	40%
Edmonton zone	187,688	1,755	32%
Central zone	59,670	595	10%
South zone	38,062	403	7%
North zone	63,202	549	11%
Unknown	126	0	0%
Total	586,108	4,591	100%

== See also ==
2022 monkeypox outbreak in Canada
