= DP3T =

DP3T can mean:

- a double pole, triple throw switch, see switch#Contact terminology
- the Decentralized Privacy-Preserving Proximity Tracing protocol
