= Covid Watch =

Open source nonprofit founded in February 2020

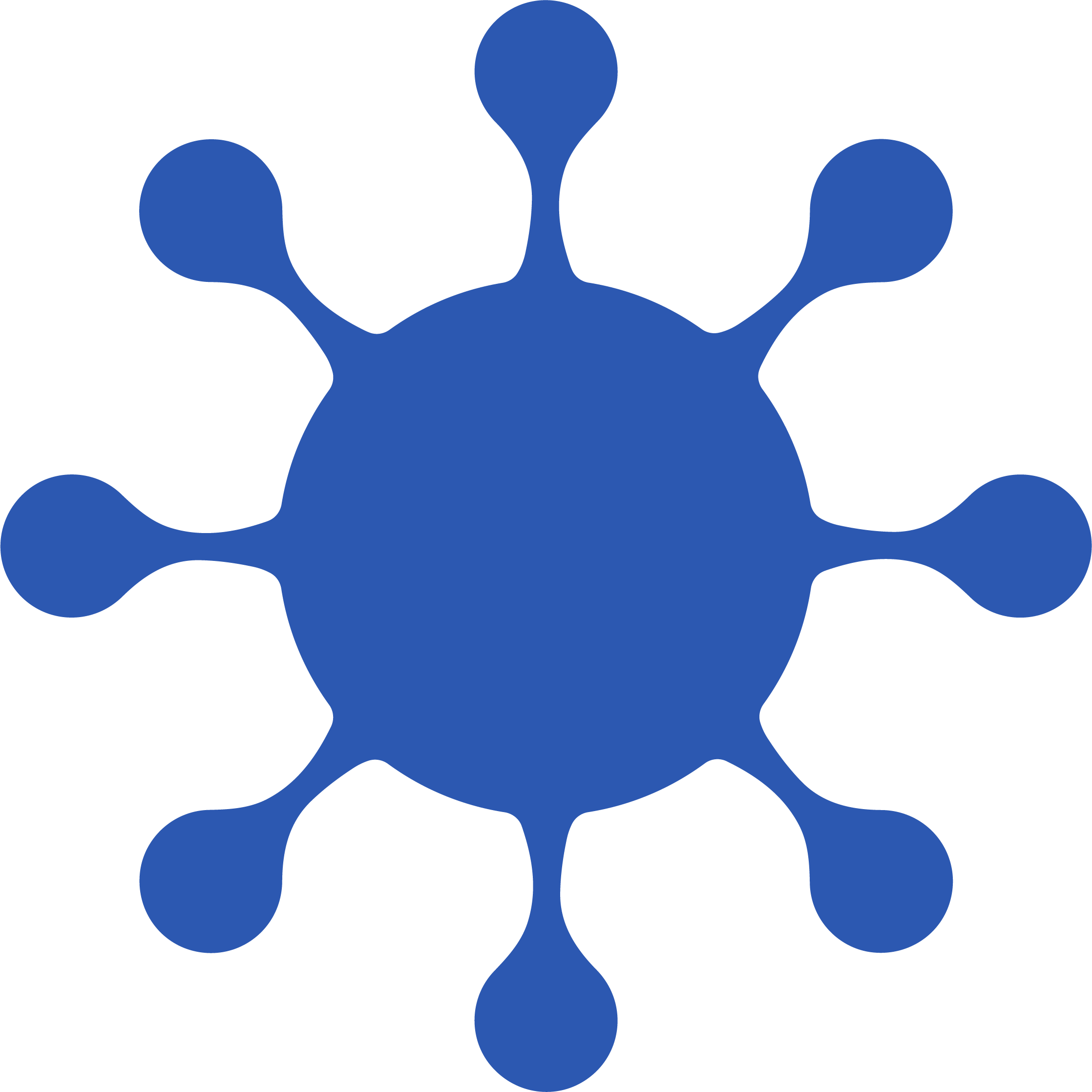
- Formation: February 19, 2020
- Founder: Tina White
- Founded at: Stanford, CA
- Type: nonprofit
- Headquarters: Tucson, AZ
- Products: COVID-19 app solution using GAEN or TCN Protocols
- Services: Exposure Alerts
- Executive Director: Tina White
- Founder: James Petrie
- Founder: Rhys Fenwick
- Founder: Zsombor Szabo
- Volunteers: 200+ active
- Website: www.wehealth.org

Covid Watch was an open source nonprofit founded in February 2020 with the mission of building mobile technology to fight the COVID-19 pandemic while defending digital privacy. The Covid Watch founders became concerned about emerging, mass surveillance-enabling digital contact tracing technology and started the project to help preserve civil liberties during the pandemic.

Covid Watch began as an independent research collaboration between students at Stanford University, United States and the University of Waterloo, Canada and it was the first team in the world to publish a white paper, develop, and open source a fully anonymous Bluetooth exposure alert protocol - the CEN Protocol, later renamed the TCN Protocol - in collaboration with CoEpi in early March 2020. This was followed by the rapid development of very similar decentralized protocols in early April 2020 like DP-3T, PACT, and Google/Apple Exposure Notification.

The Covid Watch team had over 200 active volunteers from around the world including advisers in public health, epidemiology, privacy, policy, and law from universities like Stanford, Waterloo, UW, UCSF, and Berkeley.

Covid Watch also built a fully open source mobile app for sending anonymous exposure alerts first using their own TCN Protocol in April 2020 and later using the nearly identical protocol within the Google/Apple exposure notification (GAEN) framework when the GAEN APIs were released in May 2020. Also in May 2020, Covid Watch launched the first calibration and beta testing pilot of the GAEN APIs in the United States at the University of Arizona.

In August 2020, the app launched publicly for a phased roll-out in the state of Arizona. Covid Watch volunteers and staff also collaborated with the University of Arizona on research to improve the estimation of infection risk from anonymous Bluetooth data to better inform private quarantine recommendations.

At the end of 2020, the Covid Watch nonprofit closed, but the Covid Watch app and related open source technologies continue to be implemented for public health departments by the WeHealth organization.

== History ==
As the pandemic began its outbreak in North America, on February 19, 2020, Stanford University PhD candidate and DOE CSGF Fellow Tina White made a public Effective Altruism Forum post about researching smartphone technology like GPS to alert people privately of COVID-19 exposure. This post got the attention of James Petrie at University of Waterloo who had started writing an academic paper on Overleaf on February 7, 2020, exploring private, decentralized methods using MAC addresses. The two researchers began the research collaboration between Stanford and Waterloo, which formed into the nonprofit Covid Watch.

Anonymous, decentralized Bluetooth exposure alerts first publicly appeared on March 2, 2020, when CW's James Petrie posted a PDF describing the privacy model in CW public slack channels, shared with researchers and collaborators worldwide. Covid Watch's description of the technology and procedure for anonymous exposure alerts was shared widely on social media and on the original Covid Watch blog written by Rhys Fenwick. On March 10, 2020, Tina White reached out to Apple engineers to describe BLE anonymous contact tracing technology and background issues on iOS.

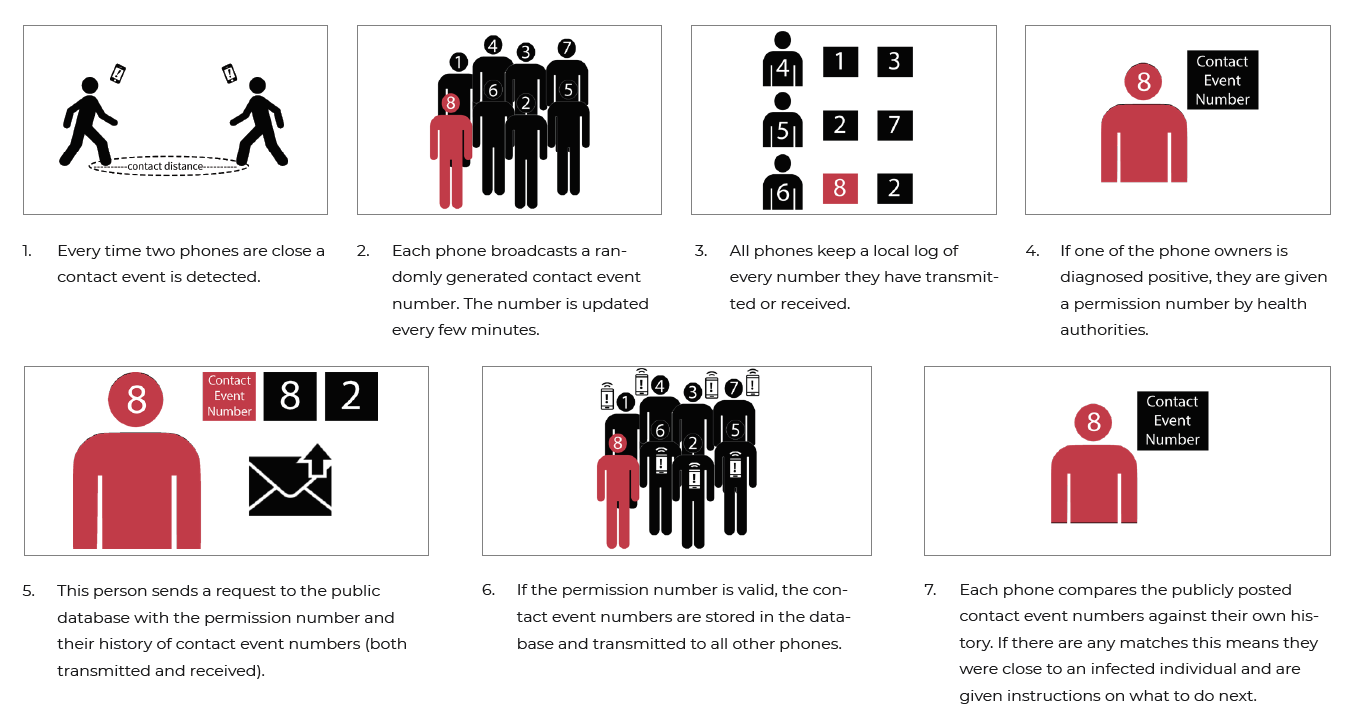
A description of the CEN Protocol: the first anonymous, decentralized Bluetooth exposure notification protocol to be published online in Covid Watch's whitepaper on 20 March 2020 and open sourced on the Covid Watch GitHub 17 March 2020.

Covid Watch developer Zsombor Szabo built the first open source, decentralized, anonymous exposure alert protocol called the CEN Protocol. On March 12, 2020, Zsombor Szabo pushed his first commit to GitHub, laying the foundations of the CW app, completing a proof of concept on March 17 and sharing the video of the working technology on YouTube. Finally, on March 20, 2020, the CW team published a White Paper describing the CEN / TCN protocol.

Tina White presented the technology at Stanford HAI's COVID-19 and AI virtual conference on April 1. After that, Covid Watch began receiving significant news coverage. Covid Watch then helped other groups like the TCN Coalition and MIT SafePaths implement the TCN Protocol within their open source projects to further the development of decentralized technology and foster global interoperability of contact tracing and exposure alerting apps, a key aspect of achieving widespread adoption.

In early April, three other teams publish decentralized, anonymous Bluetooth protocols. On April 3, 2020, the first DP^3T white paper commit is published along with its first commit on GitHub. On April 6, Henry de Valence of the Zcash Foundation publishes a comparison of CEN/TCN with the new white paper proposal from DP^3T. On April 9, 2020, the MIT PACT protocol spec authored by Rob Rivest, Ramesh Raskar, Vanessa Teague, and many more cited CW and DP^3T and Nicky Case published a comic describing how the CW and DP^3T Protocols work. Finally, after CW and CoEpi published their reference implementation CEN (TCN) protocol and along with several other teams communicated to Apple the issues they faced regarding a successful exposure notification app, Apple and Google announced their contact tracing API on April 10, 2020.

On April 28, 2020, CW implemented the TCN protocol in a fully functional anonymous exposure alert app with Android bridging, first available in Apple TestFlight via the Stanford App Store. In May 2020, Covid Watch launched the first calibration and beta testing pilot of the GAEN protocol in the United States at the University of Arizona.
