= Deena Hinshaw =

Canadian physician and health official (born 1975)

- Born: Yellowknife, Northwest Territories, Canada
- Education: Augustana University College, Camrose, Alberta; MD, MA Public Health (MPH) 2008 University of Alberta
- Occupations: Deputy Provincial Health Officer, British Columbia
- Known for: CMO during COVID-19 pandemic in Alberta
- Medical career
- Profession: Medical doctor
- Institutions: Ministry of Health (Alberta); Associate Clinical Professor, Department of Medicine at the University of Alberta
- Sub-specialties: Public health Family medicine Community medicine

Deena Hinshaw is a Canadian doctor who serves as a Deputy Provincial Health Officer for British Columbia and served as Chief Medical Officer of Health for the province of Alberta from January 28, 2019, to November 14, 2022, before being removed by Danielle Smith. She provided daily updates on the COVID-19 pandemic in Alberta to the public throughout most of 2020 and into 2021, though she stopped holding regular briefings in at the end of June 2021. She also provided recommendations to Jason Kenney, the former Premier of Alberta and the Emergency Management Cabinet Committee.

== Education ==
Hinshaw was born in Yellowknife, Northwest Territories, and grew up in Sylvan Lake, Alberta. She graduated from H.J. Cody High School in 1993 and was class valedictorian. Hinshaw received her undergraduate degree at the Augustana University College in Camrose, Alberta in 1997. She completed her medical degree (2004) and residencies in family medicine and community medicine (2006) at the University of Alberta. In 2008, she received her Master of Public Health degree at the University of Alberta, while completing her public health and preventive medicine residency.

== Career ==
On January 28, 2019, Hinshaw was appointed as Alberta's Chief Medical Officer of Health. She reported to the Deputy Minister of Health. The CMO may report directly to the Minister of Health if there is a public health emergency, or in other extraordinary conditions.

=== Chief Medical Officer of Health ===
During the 2020 coronavirus pandemic in Alberta, Hinshaw held nearly daily media events in Edmonton, since the first case of the new coronavirus in Alberta was announced on March 5. Global News reported that Hinshaw is a trusted face for many Albertans, calmly delivering the facts as cases of COVID-19 are confirmed in the province."

On March 17, on the advice of Hinshaw, Alberta Premier Jason Kenney declared a public health state of emergency under the Public Health Act (PHA).

On October 11, 2022, Premier Danielle Smith said that she would replace Hinshaw with a new advisory team that considered COVID-19 an endemic disease. On November 14, 2022, Smith fired Hinshaw and replaced her on an interim basis with Alberta Health Services vice president Mark Joffe. Hinshaw's contract was originally set to expire in 2024. Dr. Deena Hinshaw was hired as British Columbia’s Deputy Provincial Health Officer on February 1, 2023 on a temporary basis.

== Media ==
CBC News and the Canadian Press said that there was a demand for the "charcoal grey half-sleeve dress emblazoned with the periodic table of elements" that Hinshaw wore on March 17 during her daily briefing in Edmonton. The periodic table dress is made by the British Columbia-based company, Smoking Lily. The article cited a Tweet that said, "Hey national media. Alberta has a folk hero. She's calm, clear, forceful. And she wears the periodic table while she delivers information. It's wonderful."

Hinshaw faced criticism for her recommendations loosening restrictions in the summer of 2021. In July 2021, an opinion piece in The Globe and Mail described her as an "irredeemable yes-woman" as a result of her decision to end mandatory isolation for people who test positive for COVID-19, a decision the article claimed would lead to unnecessary loss of human life. Other medical experts have supported Hinshaw's recommendations, including Dr. Sarah Fortune of Harvard University's Department of Immunology and Infectious Diseases, who told CBC Radio that, “I think Alberta is taking reasonable steps in the face of having done a good job of bringing the viral numbers down and in the face of good vaccine coverage."
