= Assyrian Americans =

American citizens of Assyrian descent

Assyrian/Chaldean/Syriac Americans
Total population
- 94,000 (2022); 0.03% of the US population

Regions with significant populations
- Greater Phoenix, Arizona · East San Diego County, California · Greater Los Angeles (especially the San Fernando Valley, California · Chicagoland, Illinois · Metro Detroit, Michigan · Turlock-Modesto, California areas

Languages
- Assyrian/Aramaic, English, Arabic

Religion
- Christianity (majority: Syriac Christianity; minority: Protestantism)

Assyrian Americans, (Syriac: ܣܘܼܖ̈ܵܝܹܐ ܐܲܡܪ̈ܝܼܟܵܝܹܐ) or otherwise known as Chaldean or Syriac Americans are individuals of ethnic Assyrian ancestry born or residing within the United States. Assyrians are an ethnic group native to Mesopotamia in West Asia who descend from their ancient counterparts, directly originating from the ancient indigenous Mesopotamians of Akkad and Sumer who first developed the independent civilization in northern Mesopotamia that would become Assyria in 2600 BC. Modern Assyrians often culturally self-identify as Syriacs, Chaldeans, or Arameans for religious and tribal identification. The first significant wave of Assyrian immigration to the United States was due to the Sayfo genocide in the Assyrian homeland in 1914–1924.

The largest Assyrian diaspora in the United States is located in Metro Detroit, with a figure of 150,000. High concentrations are also located in Phoenix, San Jose, Modesto, San Diego, Los Angeles, Turlock, and Chicago among others.

In the 2020 U.S. census a total of 119,402 individuals identified as Assyrian, Chaldean or Syriac in the United States with full or partial ancestry.

As of 2022 U.S. Census Bureau estimates, there are 94,532 people in the United States declaring Assyrian/Chaldean/Syriac ancestry (with a margin of error ±7,255).

== History ==
=== Early history ===
Assyrian immigration to the United States began in the late 19th century, with a notable presence developing in New England. Syriac Orthodox Assyrians from Harput were among the early settlers, establishing a community in Worcester, Massachusetts. Many later relocated to the Boston area. This community maintained close ties with other Syriac Orthodox Assyrians, particularly those from Mardin, who settled in Central Falls, Rhode Island, and from Diyarbakır, who established communities in New Jersey. The community in New Jersey founded several civic organizations outside the church, including the Assyrian Orphanage and School Association of America.

The early Syriac Orthodox communities also developed relationships with other early Assyrian groups, such as Protestants and members of the Church of the East, who then primarily emigrated from Urmia (in northwestern Iran) and settled in New Britain, Connecticut.

=== Second wave of immigration ===
Following the turn of the century, Assyrian immigration to America mostly came to a halt due to the Immigration Act of 1924, which effectively cut off any legal immigration to the United States for Assyrians and other non-Western European groups. The second large wave of immigration occurred in the 1960s and 1970s, mainly from northern Iraq due to conflicts and persecution by the Ba'athist government of Iraq. Others arrived from Iran following the Iranian Revolution. Many Assyrians arrived during this period and took advantage of the ongoing White flight in Detroit.

As a result of the situation, Assyrians gained a monopoly over grocery stores and other small businesses, and in many cases used their finances and newfound wealth to benefit the Assyrian community there and take in Assyrian refugees from Iraq. More Assyrians arrived throughout the 1980s and 1990s for similar reasons, with newer residents moving out of Detroit into suburbs such as Royal Oak and Sterling Heights due to the crack epidemic in Detroit, while others began to move to San Diego, establishing a new Assyrian community there.

In 2005, the first Assyrian school in the United States, the Assyrian American Christian School, opened in Tarzana, Los Angeles.

=== In Michigan ===
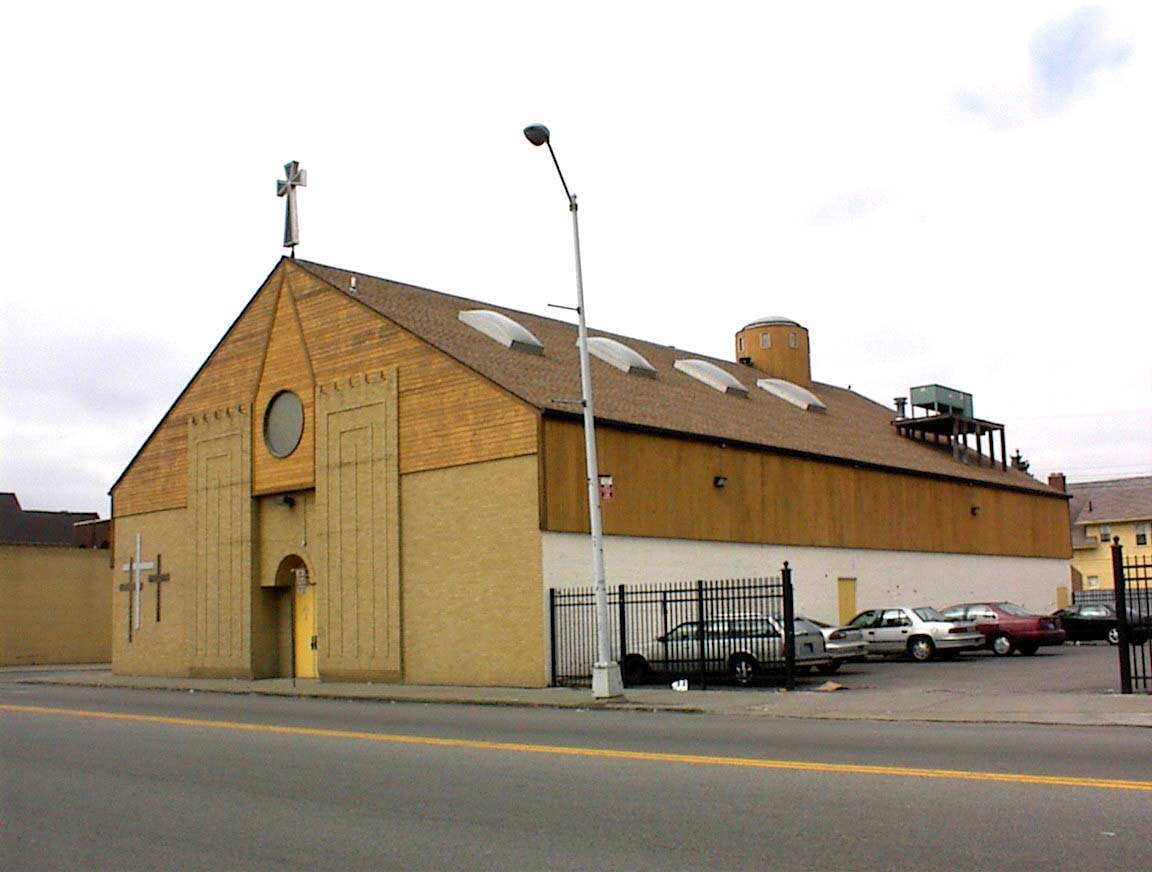
Chaldean Catholic Church in Detroit. Chaldean Catholic Assyrian immigration, mainly to Detroit, Michigan, began in the early 20th century

Assyrian immigration to cities in Michigan began in the early 20th century. The cities in the state include, but are not limited to, Detroit, Southfield, Sterling Heights, Oak Park, Troy, West Bloomfield, Walled Lake, Rochester Hills, Farmington Hills, Ferndale, Warren, Bloomfield Hills, and Ann Arbor. More and more Assyrians, as they establish themselves financially, quickly move out of Detroit and into the other locations, including San Diego and cities in Arizona.

Before the 1970s, Assyrians came to the United States in search of greater economic opportunities. After the 1970s, many Assyrians fled for political freedom, especially after the rise of Saddam Hussein and after the Gulf War. Some were drawn by the economic opportunities they had seen successfully affect their family members who had already immigrated.

Less stringent immigration laws during the 1960s and 1970s facilitated increasing numbers, with the 1970s seeing the highest number of Assyrians coming to the United States. In 1962, the number of Assyrian owned grocery stores was 120, but grew to 278 in 1972. The main cause of this was the 1967 Detroit riots, after which Jewish grocery store owners left the area and left the opportunity open for Assyrians to take over. Often these Jews sold their old stores to Assyrians.

Iraqi president Saddam Hussein donated hundreds of thousands of dollars to Chaldean Catholic Churches in Detroit and received a key to the city in the 1980s on behalf of Mayor Coleman Young, when the Ba’ath regime was an ally of the United States government.

Most new Chaldean Catholic Assyrian immigrants and low-income senior citizens tend to reside in Detroit, on the 7 Mile Road between Woodward Avenue and John R Street. This area was officially named Chaldean Town in 1999. There are eight Chaldean Catholic Churches in Metro Detroit, located in West Bloomfield, Troy (two), Oak Park, Southfield, Warren, Sterling Heights, and Detroit.

=== In California ===
After World War II, several Assyrian men who had been educated in Iraq by American Jesuits traveled to the United States. They were to teach Arabic to U.S. officers at the Army Language School who were going to be stationed in the Middle East. The men started the San Diego-area Chaldean Catholic community. Yasmeen S. Hanoosh, author of The Politics of Minority Chaldeans Between Iraq and America, wrote that the Chaldean Catholic Church in San Diego "continued to grow in relative isolation from the family-chain-migration based communities in and around Michigan."

Turlock is estimated to have approximately 20,000 residents of Assyrian descent, representing around one‑quarter of the city's population. The community has deep historical roots in the area, dating back to the early 20th century, following persecution in the Ottoman Empire and later conflicts. The Assyrian American Civic Club of Turlock serves as a cultural and community center, and the city hosts festivals and events celebrating Assyrian heritage, language, and traditions. KBDG‑FM 90.9 is a 24/7 Assyrian-language radio station broadcasting news, music, and cultural programming to local residents. El Cajon has a large Iraqi population, many of whom are Assyrian.

One of the few Assyrian churches in the Bay Area, and the only one in San Francisco, The Assyrian Church of the East (which also doubles as a day-care center) is located off Lawton Street and 46th Ave. San Francisco has nearly 500 Assyrian-American residents, although the count is often lower than what the U.S. Census usually reports as many chose terms such as "Iraqi American," "Syrian American", "Iranian American", or just simply "Middle Eastern American".

== Geographic distribution ==
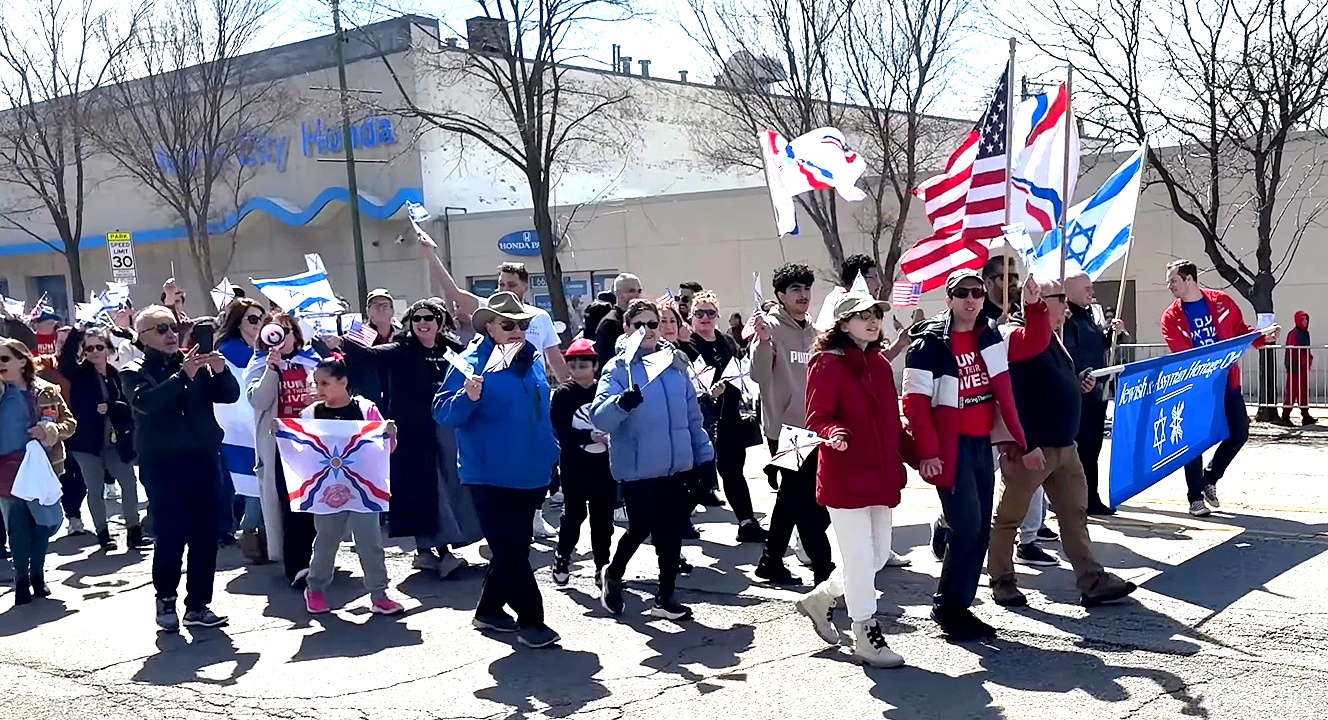
Assyrian Americans parading alongside Jewish Americans in the annual Assyrian New Year march, Chicago, 2025

In the 2020 U.S. census a total of 119,402 individuals identified as Assyrian, Chaldean or Syriac in the United States with full or partial ancestry.

According to the 2022 American Community Survey 1-Year Estimates, 94,532 people in the United States are of Assyrian/Chaldean/Syriac ancestry (with a margin of error ±7,255). The Census Bureau lists all three groups as one option on forms. Michigan, California, and Illinois account for 80% of the Assyrian population living in the US.

=== Other Estimates ===
In 2020 the Arizona State Legislature approved a resolution to recognize Sayfo, including a section which stated that 600,000 Assyrians live in the United States.

=== Michigan ===
There were 34,484 Assyrians living in Michigan according to the 2000 United States census. The 2022 estimates put this number at 41,020, with the overwhelming majority of the population–95%–residing in the Metro Detroit area counties of Macomb County (23,707), Oakland County (14,535), and Wayne County (665).

=== California ===
There were 22,671 Assyrians living in California according to the 2000 United States census. The 2022 estimates put this number at 24,748. The state's largest Assyrian American population lives in San Diego County (9,165), followed by Los Angeles County (3,642), Santa Clara County (2,919), and Orange County (1,816). The population in Southern California accounts for more than 60% of the state's total Assyrian population estimate.

A little over 16% of the state's population of Assyrians (4,097) reside in the Central Valley and San Francisco Bay Area, places known for several Eastern Assyrian, Chaldean Catholic, and Syriac Orthodox churches. These include:

- Santa Clara County (2,919)
- Sacramento County (663)
- San Francisco (201)
- Contra Costa County (198)
- Alameda County (65)
- San Mateo County (51)

=== Illinois ===
There were 15,685 Assyrians living in Illinois according to the 2000 United States census. As of the 2022 estimate, that number has held steady at 15,694, with over 89% of that population residing in Cook County (14,035). As of the 2023 American Community Survey five-year estimates, the largest populations reside in Chicago (3,099) and the adjacent northern suburbs of Niles (1,113) and Skokie (2,768).

DuPage County (241) and Lake County (213) have the second- and third-highest populations.

== Assyrian, Syrian, Syriac ==
The federal government of the United States took the word Syrian to mean Arabs from the Syrian Arab Republic and not as one of the terms to identify the ethnically distinct Assyrians, although the terms Syrian and Syriac are strongly accepted by mainstream majority academic opinion to be etymologically, historically, geographically, and ethnically derivative of the earlier term Assyrian, and historically meant Assyrian (see name of Syria) and not Arab or Aramean. In addition, the Syrian Arab Republic is home to many ethnicities, including Arabs, Assyrians, Armenians, Kurds, and Turkmens, and is thus not an exclusively Arab nation.

The Syriac Orthodox Church was formerly known as the Syrian Orthodox Church until a Holy Synod in 2000 voted to change it to Syriac, thus distinguishing it from the Arabs. Mor Cyril Aphrem Karim wrote a letter to the Syriacs in 2000 urging them to register in the census as Syriac with a C, not Syrian with an N, to distinguish the group. He also urged them not to register as the country of origin. The Church was previously known as the Assyrian Orthodox Church in America and Israel-Palestine, which can be seen in the name of the Syriac Orthodox Church of Paramus, New Jersey.

The term Chaldean refers to ethnic Assyrians who are (traditionally) Eastern Catholic, having separated from the Assyrian Church in Upper Mesopotamia between the 17th and 19th centuries (see Schism of 1552). Chaldean is thus a religious term, not an ethnic term. The majority of Chaldean Catholics come from Iraq's Nineveh Plains region, which is located in Upper Mesopotamia (northern Iraq). The Chaldeans of antiquity lived in southeast Mesopotamia from the 9th century BC and disappeared from history in the 6th century BC.

On the U.S. census, there is a section for Assyrian/Chaldean/Syriac, which is listed separately from Syrian, Syrian being a subcategory for Arab.

== Notable people ==
- Awa III (born David Royel), the 122nd Catholicos-Patriarch of the Assyrian Church of the East
- Ignatius Aphrem II, 123rd Patriarch of the Syriac Orthodox Church of Antioch
- Brian Awadis (FaZe Rug), YouTuber
- Terrence Malick, film director, screenwriter, and producer
- Adam Benjamin Jr., former politician and a U.S. Representative from Indiana's 1st congressional district
- Rosie Malek-Yonan, actress, author, director, public figure, and activist
- Anna Eshoo, former U.S. Representative for California's 18th congressional district
- Victor Kamber, labor union activist and political consultant in the United States
- Patrick Bet-David, half Assyrian, half Armenian businessman and podcast host
- Narsai David, author, radio and television personality in the Bay Area
- Scott Rumana, Assyrian-American Republican Party politician
- Jumana Hanna, imprisoned at the facility known as Al Kelab Al Sayba, or Loose Dogs, during the rule of Saddam Hussein
- Reine Hanna, director of the Assyrian Policy Institute
- Diane Pathieu, television anchor
- Christopher A. Sarkiss, Assyrian-American neurosurgeon
- Larsa Pippen, reality television personality
- Janan Sawa, Assyrian musician
- Timz, Assyrian American rapper
- Justin Meram, footballer
- Sargon Dadesho, campaigner, nationalist
- Michael Shabaz, Assyrian American tennis player
- Beneil Dariush, Assyrian American professional mixed martial artist
- Daniel Alaei, professional poker player
- John Batchelor, American author and host of The John Batchelor Show radio news magazine
- Bob Miner, former American businessman, co-founder of Oracle Corporation and the producer of Oracle's relational database management system.
- John Joseph (historian), Assyrian-American educator and historian
- Steven Beitashour, international soccer player
- John Nimrod, U.S. politician
- Atour Sargon, Assyrian activist and politician
- Andrew David Urshan, evangelist and author
- Juliana Taimoorazy, activist, founder and current president of the Iraqi Christian Relief Council
- Jacob David, pastor and relief worker
- David B. Perley, philosopher and nationalist
- Wadie P. Deddeh, former California State Senator for the 40th district and California State Representative for the 77th and 80th district
