= Open for Business =

Open for Business may refer to:

- Open for Business (blog), online news blog with a technology focus.
- Open for Business (TV series), Irish business series
- Open for Business, 2006 album by Timz
- The Sims 2: Open for Business, expansion pack for The Sims 2
