= Irma Suarez Ruiz =

Irma Suarez Ruiz (born 1959) is an American dancer, educator, choreographer, director, and costume designer. She is the Artistic Director for the Ensemble Español Spanish Dance Theater at Northeastern Illinois University in Chicago, Illinois.

== Early life and education ==
Born in Chicago, Ruiz (of Mexican and Puerto Rican descent) moved to Mexico City to live with her family for a period before moving back to Chicago. Graduating from Senn High School in Chicago, she saw a performance of Ensemble Español as a freshman at Northeastern Illinois University. With a new aspiration to become a Spanish dancer, she began taking dance classes as well as the evening community workshops offered by Ensemble Español. In 1979, Ruiz began official dance training in Spanish dance and classical ballet with Dame Libby Komaiko. Ruiz received a scholarship apprenticeship to the Ensemble Español Spanish Dance Theater that same year.

In 1983, Ruiz graduated from Northeastern Illinois University with a B.A. in Foreign Languages and Literature and a minor in Dance.

Ruiz is married to Antonio Ruiz. She is the mother of Crystal, Tiffany, Brandon, Tyler, and Collin. She is also grandmother to Manolo and Emily.

== Career ==
Making a career out of Spanish dancing, over the next four decades, Ruiz climbed from company dancer in 1980 to Soloist, First dancer in 1986, Instructor, Associate Artistic Director, and currently Artistic Director with Ensemble Español Spanish Dance Theater.

At the Amor de Dios Flamenco Dance Academy in Spain, Ruiz studied with Spanish dancers Candela Soto and Paco Romero. She also trained in Spain with El Guito, Belen Maya, Cristian Almodovar, La China, and Aida Gomez. Other Spanish dancers and choreographers she worked with include Paco Alonso, Maria Alba, Juanjo Linares, Roberto Lorca, Manolete, Edo, and Carmela Grec. For ballet, Ruiz worked with Anna Czajun, and National Ballet of Spain founding members, Juan Mata and Ana González.

Ruiz became a member of the dance faculty of the Department of Music and Dance Programs at Northeastern Illinois University in 2006, teaching Spanish dance.

As a choreographer, Ruiz has completed multiple works for the Ensemble Español's arts education program and Youth Company, as well as five full ballets for the company. As the Artistic Director of Ensemble Español Spanish Dance Theater, she trains Spanish dancers, designs costumes, sets and maintains structure in rehearsals, organizes programming for events, and manages casting and new choreographies. During the season, she also coordinates with global guest artists to add new choreography works to the company’s repertoire.

Ruiz continues to perform with the Ensemble Español Company throughout the season and at the annual American Spanish Dance and Music Festival. She has toured internationally with the company to Australia, Poland, Costa Rica, Mexico, Puerto Rico, Spain, and China.

== Honors ==
- Chicago Council on Fine Arts, Neighborhood Arts Project Grant
- Chicago Department of Cultural Affairs, Viva Latina Dance Master Award (1993)
- Ruth Page Foundation and Northeastern Illinois University, Artistic Ambassador Award
- St. Louis Cultural Flamenco Society, Twentieth Anniversary Award (2004)
- Northeastern Illinois University Excellence in Fine Arts Award (2007)
