= Tamraz =

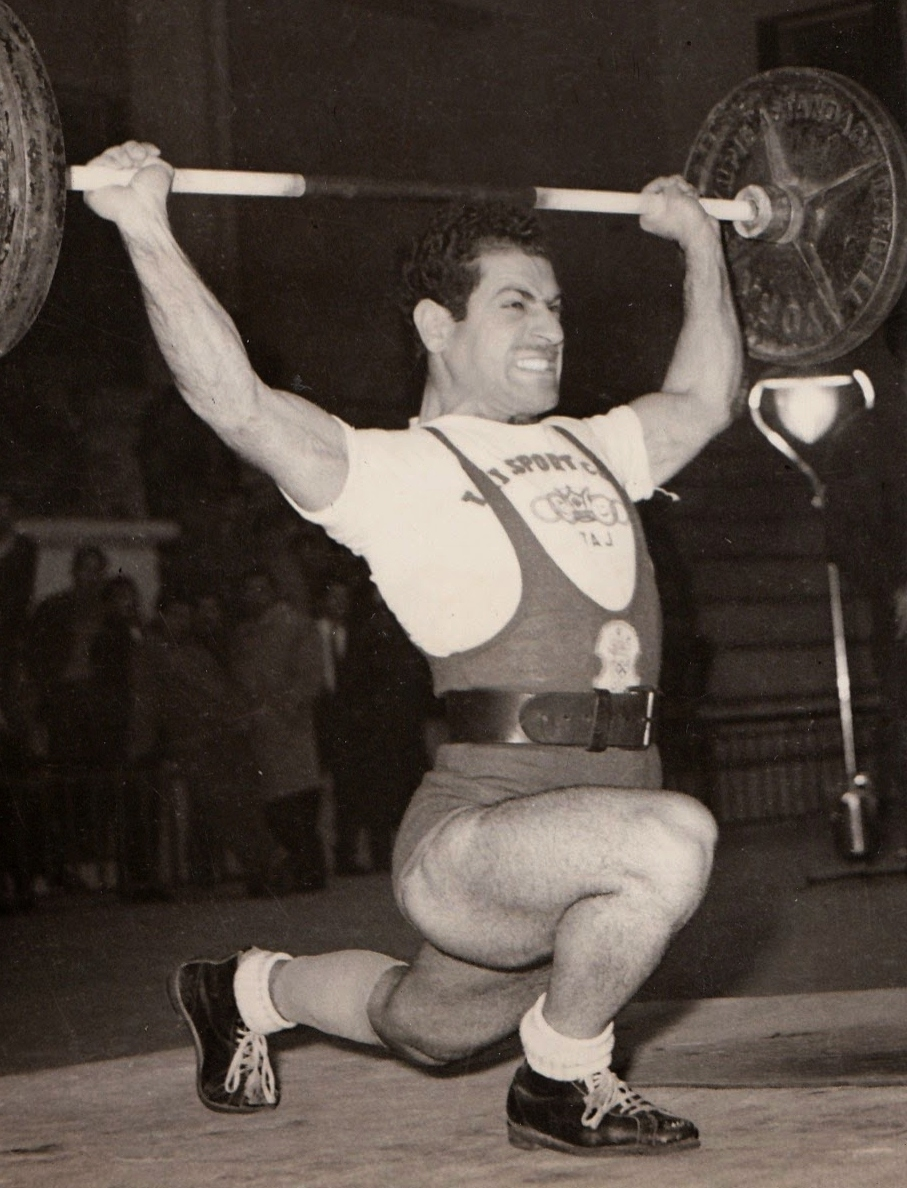
Henrik Tamraz competing in weightlifting

Tamraz, also spelled as Tamras (Arabic: تمرز, Syriac: ܬܡܪܙ) is a Neo-Aramaic and Lebanese Arabic surname. The surname is most predominantly used by ethnic Assyrians from West Asia. Additionally, there is a plateau (Dhour Tamraz) in Bikfaya, Lebanon named after a branch of the Tamraz family that descend from the village of Tel Keppe in the Nineveh Plains.

Notable people with this surname include:

- Cathy Baron Tamraz (born 1953), Business Wire’s Chairwoman and CEO
- Mar Elia Tamras, Assyrian bishop of Baghdad, Ukraine and Georgia
- Henrik Tamraz (1935–1996), Assyrian from Iran who competed in weightlifting in the Olympics
- Juliana Taimoorazy (born 1973), Assyrian activist and founder of the Iraqi Christian Relief Council
- Nayla Tamraz, Lebanese writer and art critic
- Roger Tamraz (born 1940), American banker and venture capital investor of Assyrian-Lebanese descent
- Victor Bet Tamraz, Assyrian pastor sentenced for Christian activities in Iran
- Mar Yohannan Tamraz, Chaldean Catholic bishop of Kirkuk
