= OFB =

OFB may refer to:

- Original Fila Brasileiro, a working farm dog breed from Brazil
- Ordnance Factories Board, an Indian industrial setup engaged in the production of arms, ammunition and other equipment for military and civilian applications
- Austrian Football Association (German: Österreichischer Fußball-Bund, ÖFB)
- Outflow boundary, in meteorology, the leading edge of precipitation-cooled air emanating from a thunderstorm
- Output feedback, a mode of operation for block ciphers in cryptography
- Overseas Filipino Bank, a state-owned bank in the Philippines
- Oklahoma Farm Bureau
- Open for Business (blog), an online general interest publication with a technology focus
- The Sims 2: Open for Business
- Oregon Food Bank
- OFB (rap group), or Original Farm Boys, a UK drill music group
- Operation Forth Bridge, the national plan for handling the death of Prince Philip
