= Jorge Pérez (dancer) =

Jorge Pérez (born 1964 in San Juan, Puerto Rico) is an American dancer, choreographer, educator, and director. He is the Executive and Associate Artistic Director for the Ensemble Español Spanish Dance Theater at Northeastern Illinois University in Chicago, Illinois.

Pérez attended Northeastern Illinois University, as a speech and performing arts major, and took an administrative assistant position with Ensemble Español in 1984. He realized, after seeing Ensemble Español perform on stage for the first time, that Spanish dance was an innate part of his character. In 1985, with a scholarship apprenticeship, his formal Spanish dance training with Dame Libby Komaiko began. A year later, Pérez became a company dancer.

Pérez graduated from Northeastern Illinois University with a B.A. in Speech Communication/Performing Arts and a minor in Dance.

== Career ==
Pérez continued his training in ballet with Anna Czajun and in modern dance with Venetia Stifler and Nana Shineflug. In Spain and the U.S. he studied with Manuel Reyes, Paco Romero, Maria Magdalena, Candela Soto, Edo, Paco Alonso, Roberto Lorca, Carmela Greco and the National Ballet of Spain founding members, Juan Mata and Ana Gonzalez. He was promoted to first dancer, instructor, associate artistic director and eventually executive director.

Over the years Pérez has appeared as a guest artist in various music and dance festivals. On the faculty for the Ensemble Español’s Flamenco community workshops, he contributes to choreographies of major works and leads the international artistic/cultural/exchange trips for student dancers.

Pérez serves on the board of Audience Architects and graduated from the Goldman Sachs 10,000 Small Businesses Program in 2014. In 2017, Pérez served on the welcoming panel for the 2017 cohort 18 class with special guests Lloyd Blankfein, CEO of Goldman Sachs, and Chicago Mayor Rahm Emanuel.

Pérez continues to perform with the Ensemble Español Company throughout the season and at the annual American Spanish Dance and Music Festival. He has toured internationally with the company to Australia, Poland, Costa Rica, Mexico, Puerto Rico, Spain, and China.

== Honors ==
- Dr. Bernard Brommel endowed two scholarships for Ensemble Español dancers, Brommel-Komaiko-Pérez Endowment Scholarship and Brommel- Pérez Endowment Scholarship for male student/dancers.
- Ruth Page Foundation and Northeastern Illinois University, Artistic Ambassador Award
- Richard M. Daley (former Chicago Mayor) Appreciation Award (2002)
- St. Louis Cultural Flamenco Society, Twentieth Anniversary Award (2004)
- Ensemble Español’s Ambassador Award (2009)
- Named Who's Who in Hispanic Chicago by Negocios Now (2016)
