= Ensemble Español Spanish Dance Theater =

American Spanish-dance company

Ensemble Español Spanish Dance Theater is an American Spanish-dance company in residence at Northeastern Illinois University in Chicago. The Ensemble Español consists of the professional dance company, touring nationally and internationally throughout the year, as well as the youth company. The Ensemble Español provides arts education programming to students across Chicago, runs community outreach programs/workshops, offers college level dance courses at Northeastern Illinois University, and produces the annual American Spanish Dance and Music Festival.

The company was founded in 1975 by Dame Libby Komaiko, American classical dancer and educator, with a mission to preserve, promote and present the flamenco, folkloric, classical, and contemporary dance and music traditions of Spain. After returning from a four-week study at the Boston Conservatory of Music with Spanish artists Nana Lorca and Jose Greco in 1976 (funded by Northeastern Illinois University and the Union of Puerto Rican Students), Komaiko formally launched the Ensemble Español with just seven students.

Komaiko fostered a family atmosphere throughout the years often creating choreographies for specific dancers while offering various organizational roles to others who didn't want to leave the family. Some of Komaiko's earliest dancers, Irma Suarez Ruiz, who began training with Komaiko in 1979, as well as Jorge Pérez, who began training with Komaiko in 1985, are still with the company today. Ruiz and Pérez, dance partners, still perform in Komaiko's signature piece “Bolero” (1993) even though Ruiz now serves as the Artistic Director while Pérez is the Executive and the Associate Artistic Director.

== Professional company ==
Today the company consists of over 40 dancers, singers, musicians and administrative staff. It presents over one hundred Spanish dance educational programs a year, reaching nearly 20,000 students in arts education programming. The Ensemble Español has trained over 95 professional dancers, taught over 7,800 academic Spanish dance class students at Northeastern Illinois University, and performed over 135 original full-length choreographies and over 4,000 concerts worldwide.

The Ensemble Español has collaborated with the Chicago Human Rhythm Project and its Stomping Ground Festival, the Flamenco Festival produced by Instituto Cervantes, and the Auditorium Theatre at Roosevelt University's "Made in Chicago" dance series. The Ensemble Español has toured nationally and internationally, including in Mexico, Australia, Puerto Rico, China, Costa Rica, Poland, and Spain.

The Ensemble has performed at the Chicago Dancing Festival, the annual Dance for Life benefit, the Jacob's Pillow Dance Festival Inside/Out Series, and Dance St. Louis.

The Ensemble Español has studied and collaborated with Spanish dancers and artists including Manolete, Juanjo Linares, Nana Lorca, Lola Montes, José Greco, Manuel Reyes, Paco Romero, Maria Alba, Maria Magdalena, Candela Soto, Edo, Paco Alonso, Roberto Lorca, Paloma Gomez, Carmela Greco, and the National Ballet of Spain founding members, Juan Mata and Ana Gonzalez.

In 1983, King Juan Carlos I, King of Spain, awarded Ensemble Español founder Libby Komaiko, the honor of the Lazo de Dama (Ribbon of the Dame) de Isabel la Catolica for spreading the cultural and artistic values of Spain throughout the U.S.

Other honors have included White House President Barack Obama sending Ensemble Español a letter recognizing the organization's work, as well as the creation of three endowed scholarships for Ensemble Español dancers to attend Northeastern Illinois University and one foundation endowment for the general operating programs of the organization.

== Youth company ==
In 1985, committed to bringing this culturally specific art form and education to a range of students across the city to change lives, Komaiko and Lillian Hemnover, executive director of the Frederick Funston School, launched the Ensemble Español's youth company.

The Youth Company contains the Junior Division (ages 10–18) and the Senior Division (18+). The Youth Company functions as a pre-professional training program to the professional company, which holds annual auditions.

The Youth Company performs at annual holiday concerts, the annual American Spanish Dance and Music Festival, and the Our Chance to Dance Youth Festival. Curated and produced by Ensemble Español, the Our Chance to Dance Youth Festival invites other training academies to participate in master classes, special events, and a final performance. Past participants include Kuumba Lynx, Move Me Soul, ChiArts, Chicago Lights, Ballet Chicago, the Joel Hall Dance Youth Ensemble, the Red Clay Youth Ensemble, and the Natya Dance Theatre Youth Ensemble.

== Classes and community workshops ==
The annual American Spanish Dance and Music Festival is a two-week event held each June at a range of venues, including Northeastern Illinois University, the North Shore Center for The Performing Arts, and the Old Town School of Folk Music, among others. Activities consist of three concert length performances, master classes and workshops, musical concerts, and seminars and panel discussions. The master classes, open to the public, are targeted to aspiring and established dancers throughout the region.

The festival has involved the works and performances of artists and choreographers such as Juan Mata and Ana Gonzales, founding members of the National Ballet of Spain; Camela Greco, master dancer, choreographer, and daughter of legendary Jose Greco; Paloma Gomez, former principal dancer with the National Ballet of Spain; Rachel Gomez, former principal dancer and rehearsal mistress of the National Ballet of Spain, and many others.

In addition, the Ensemble Español conducts a variety of community workshops for all ages and levels of experience throughout the year as well a college credit dance courses at Northeastern Illinois University.

== Arts education programs ==
The Paso A Paso, or Step by Step, education program, created and taught by professional dance educators, focuses on Flamenco, folkloric, and classical dance instruction in three formats for young students and dancers.

The three components of Ensemble Español's Paso a Paso Arts Education Program are:

Spain's Dancing Rhythms consists of a 45-minute lecture/demonstration, led by a professional dancer, that covers Spanish dance and music vocabulary, instruments, rhythms, and the history and styles of Spanish dance.

Tales of Spain consists of an hour-long concert style performance, with professionally dancers typically presented in Northeastern Illinois University's auditorium, and a lecture designed to teach children about Spanish dance styles and the cultures that influenced their origins.

¡Bailamos! Residencies consist of an eight-week (or longer) schedule with curriculum that concentrates on dance movement and expression, teamwork, Spanish dance technique, and the three styles of Spanish dance.

In addition to Paso a Paso, the Ensemble Español participates in the After School Matters program, founded by the late Chicago First Lady, Margaret Daley. The organization teaches Spanish dance in four Chicago public schools during a full school year.

== The Company ==
Leadership

- Dame Libby Komaiko, Founder
- Irma Suarez Ruiz, Artistic Director, Former First Dancer
- Jose Torres, Associate Artistic Director, Former First Dancer
- Jorge Pérez, Executive Director, Former First Dancer

Current Company

- Samantha Micklewright, Company Dancer
- Jonathan Pacheco, Company Dancer/Youth Company Instructor
- Nalanie Molina, Company Dancer/Youth Company Program Manager
- Juan Carlos Castellon, Company Dancer former Principal Dancer
- Abigail Mosquera, Company Dancer
- Matthew Jalac, Company Dancer
- Catherine Beza, Company Dancer
- Katie Bartels, Company Dancer/Youth Company Instructor
- Jocelyn Leving, Company Dancer
- Kamila Galecki, Company Apprentice
- Abby Valdez, Company Apprentice
- Nestor Corona, Guest Company Dancer
- Laila Galecki, Guest Company Dancer
