= Open for Business (TV series) =

- Genre: COVID-19 business series
- Created by: Raidió Teilifís Éireann (RTÉ)
- Presented by: Richard Curran; Ella McSweeney
- Country of origin: Ireland
- Original language: English
- No. of series: 2
- No. of episodes: 12

Production
- Production location: Donnybrook, Dublin

Original release
- Network: RTÉ One
- Release: 21 July 2020 – 3 June 2021

Open for Business is an Irish business series to guide Irish businesses as the country emerged from lockdown during the COVID-19 pandemic. First aired on 21 July 2020 on RTÉ One, it is presented by Richard Curran and Ella McSweeney, and is sponsored by Enterprise Ireland.

== Episodes ==
=== Series 1 ===
==== Episode 1 ====
The first episode aired on 21 July 2020.

- It turned the spotlight on how small businesses in Ennis, County Clare have coped with the phased reopening of the economy of Ireland.
- The presenters also spoke to the Chief Executive of Musgrave about the changes in grocery spending and shopping habits during the COVID-19 crisis.

==== Episode 2 ====
The second episode aired on 26 July 2020.

- Its prime focus was on the tourism industry where it lacked visitors to Ireland.
- They examined the government's guidelines to allow businesses to reopen across the country.
- The presenters spoke to Chief Inspector at the Health and Safety Authority Mark Cullen.
- They heard from three family-run businesses from West Cork to County Louth who are trying to adapt their businesses, after being forced in lockdown to re-examine their business models and revenue streams.

==== Episode 3 ====
The third episode aired on 4 August 2020.

- The presenters took a look at the economic impact that working from home will have on small and large businesses.
- Lawyer Cliona Kimber joined the presenters in the studio to discuss all that employers need to know if they have employees working from home.
- It looked at supply chains, and the lessons Irish businesses learned about the risks of relying on one international supplier for sourcing raw materials.
- The presenters interviewed the CEO of Eir Carolan Lennon to discuss her company's employees working from home and about broadband reach across Ireland.

==== Episode 4 ====
The fourth episode aired on 11 August 2020.

- Its main focus was on events and attractions in Ireland and how these businesses coped with the impact of COVID-19.
- Founder of Indiependence Music & Arts Festival Shane Dunne joined the presenters in studio to discuss the industry worries.
- It took a closer look at family-run businesses at the heart of Irish SMEs, who have all felt the impact of COVID-19 and just want to get back to business.
- Tánaiste and Minister for Enterprise, Trade and Employment Leo Varadkar also joined the presenters in studio to discuss trying to strike a balance between public health and keeping Irish business going.
- The presenters spoke to a bus company in Kilkenny founded by the current owner's grandfather 101 years ago, but is currently only operating 10% of his fleet.
- The presenters spoke to a Croatian café owner in Finglas, who had fulfilled their dream of running their own business, discusses why they shut their doors for good.

==== Episode 5 ====
The fifth episode aired on 18 August 2020.

- It looked at the business of real estate and a closer look at the construction industry.
- The presenters meet Irish print and design company Jill & Gill who are benefitting from a new initiative that sees commercial developers with empty retail units offer a space to small businesses across Ireland.
- Real Estate Advisor Mark Synnott offered expert advice for employers who struggled to hang on to their business premises.
- The presenters saw how health and safety measures are being implemented at some of Ireland's biggest construction sites.
- The President of Chambers Ireland Siobhan Kinsella discussed what happened with office and retail spaces across the country.
- The presenters interviewed the Chief Commercial Officer of NearForm Larry Breen to speak about the company's development of the COVID Tracker contact tracing app.

==== Episode 6 ====
The sixth and final episode of series 1 aired on 25 August 2020.

- It looked at how the childcare sector in Ireland is facing as they try to adapt to COVID-19 measures while still opening their doors to as many children as possible.
- Minister for Children, Equality, Disability, Integration and Youth Roderic O'Gorman discussed what the government is doing to help childcare business owners get through this next phase, the financial packages available and measures to help parents get the services they need to enable them to return to work.
- It looked at new business hopefuls as the presenters meets with people that embody the Irish entrepreneurial spirit that keeps small businesses up and down the country going. Businesses include a bike shop in County Wexford, set up by a 22-year-old cycling enthusiast, a new barber shop on Dublin's northside, and a brother and sister who have opened a new grocery store in Sandymount.
- It heard from a range of businesses from the County Mayo college boys setting up a sustainable clothing company, a new beauty spa in Dublin, to the pastry chef from Galway now making artisan chocolates.
- Jenny Melia, Divisional Manager of High Potential Start-ups with Enterprise Ireland, talked about the range of grants and supports available for start-ups and other businesses trying to navigate COVID-19 and Brexit, as well as where SMEs can go for further advice.

=== Series 2 ===
==== Episode 1 ====
The first episode of series 2 aired on 29 April 2021.

- It focused on COVID-19 vaccines and explored what it took to mass produce such a vital drug.
- It highlighted the Irish manufacturers playing their part in the fight against COVID-19.
- The presenters spoke to and interviewed:
  - Deirdre Robertson of the Economic and Social Research Institute and spoke about how the vaccine rollout in Ireland might affect consumer behaviour.
  - Colm O'Callaghan of PwC Ireland and discussed government supports and schemes, what's in place, what's needed, and what might disappear.

==== Episode 2 ====
The second episode of series 2 aired on 6 May 2021.

- It looked at how sports clubs generate income during the pandemic and asked the question when could everyone start thinking about travel again.
- The presenters spoke to and interviewed:
  - Nóirín Hegarty, Chair of the Tourism Recovery Oversight Group, to discuss how the tourism industry in Ireland was handling the recovery.
  - John Mullins, who worked in advertising and sports sponsorship and was who a board member of Páirc Uí Chaoimh, about the sports sector and how it would open up again to the public.
  - A family who hope their new reusables business, Ecoset, could help eliminate the use of single use plastic and protect our beaches from litter.

==== Episode 3 ====
The third episode of series 2 aired on 13 May 2021.

- It looked at the charity sector with charities across the country forced to come up with new ways to raise money.
- It featured Huku Balance, a County Donegal business giving surfers some balance on land.
- The presenters spoke to and interviewed:
  - Denise Charlton, CEO of The Community Foundation for Ireland, which had given over €75 million in grants to 5,000 organisations over the past 21 years.
  - Sinead McSweeney VP, Public Policy at Twitter EMEA and MD of Twitter Dublin, about the future of the workspace.

==== Episode 4 ====
The fourth episode of series 2 aired on 20 May 2021.

- It looked at how extra paperwork was lucrative for one custom agent, yet a nightmare for truck drivers on a strict deadline.
- With Ireland's nightlife effectively closed since March 2020, the presenters met the DJs fighting to save Ireland's night clubs; drag queens hosting Zoom dating shows; and the comedians learning how to go viral.
- The presenters heard from OceanR, a Cork company taking plastics that pollute our oceans and turning them into sustainable clothing that is sold all over the world.
- The presenters spoke to and interviewed Kim O'Callaghan of the events and entertainment working group, EPIC to discuss the status of nightlife in Ireland.

==== Episode 5 ====
The fifth episode of series 2 aired on 27 May 2021.

- The presenters examined rural relocation during and following the pandemic.
- The presenters interviewed and spoke to:
  - Martina Hennessy, Managing Director at online mortgage platform, Doddl to discuss the practicalities of making the move from cities to rural areas.
  - An architect Róisín Murphy about the future of cities and transport in a world changed by the pandemic.

==== Episode 6 ====
The sixth and final episode of series 2 aired on 3 June 2021.

- The presenters visited restaurants and cafés to see what and how they were planning for a summer outdoors.
- The presenters turned their attention to the retail sector.
- The presenters interviewed and spoke to:
  - Duncan Graham, Managing Director at Retail Excellence Ireland, to explore how retail had been faring since its reopening.
  - Hospitality Consultant Paul O'Connor, to discuss the ins and outs of the restaurant reopenings.
