= Man Eating Bugs =

1998 book by Peter Menzel and Faith D'Alusio

- Author: Peter Menzel and Faith D'Alusio
- Language: English
- Publisher: Random House
- Publication date: 1998
- Publication place: United States
- Media type: Print (Hardcover and paperback)
- ISBN: 9781580080224

Man Eating Bugs: The Art and Science of Eating Insects is a non-fiction book by Peter Menzel and Faith D'Alusio.

== Book summary ==
The authors traveled to 13 countries to taste insects. The book talks about eating insects and how to harvest them. The animals in the book include insects like jumil stinkbugs, witchetty grub, and silkworms, but also arachnids (not insects) like Theraphosa blondi (a bird-eating tarantula). Faith recommends that people who are new to insect eating start with insects that crisp up well when roasted and avoiding things like worms, which are too chewy, or cicadas, which are too fleshy and tough.

== Reception ==
The book was reviewed favorably by Whole Earth, New Scientist, and Salt Lake Tribune.

== See also ==
- Entomophagy
- The Eat-A-Bug Cookbook
