= Christopher A. Sarkiss =

American neurosurgeon

Christopher A. Sarkiss, MD, FACS, FAANS
- Education: MD at David Geffen School of Medicine at UCLA (2011) BS at University of California, Los Angeles (2007)
- Occupation: Neurosurgeon
- Awards: Top Doctors In America (2023, 2024)

Christopher A. Sarkiss is an American neurosurgeon who specializes in the field of brain and spine tumors. He serves as the medical director for neuro-oncology and the pituitary tumor program at Ventura County Medical Center (VCMC). He is among just a handful of neurosurgeons across the globe of Assyrian and Armenian descent. He also serves as the Chief Medical Advisor for Silicon Valley Advantage, a female-founded accelerator and innovation center specializing in AI, biotech, and sustainability. He has authored authored over 25 scientific journal publications and several neurosurgery book chapters.

== Education ==
Sarkiss graduated from University of California, Los Angeles with a B.S. in Neuroscience and a minor in Political Science with summa cum laude honors in 2007 where he conducted research in spinal cord injury. He obtained his medical degree with honors from the David Geffen School of Medicine at UCLA in 2011. He joined the Department of Neurosurgery at the Icahn School of Medicine at Mount Sinai in New York City to complete his neurosurgery residency in 2018 at the Mount Sinai Hospital. He completed a surgical neuro-oncology fellowship at Jackson Memorial Hospital and the University of Miami Health System in 2019 under the mentorship of Dr. Ricardo Komotar.

== Career and expertise ==
Sarkiss is an American board-certified neurosurgeon with fellowship training who has expertise in treating and performing surgery for gliomas, brain metastasis, meningiomas, pituitary tumors, skull base surgery, stereotactic radiosurgery, and spine tumors. He is an expert in various surgical techniques that include minimally invasive endoscopic surgery, awake craniotomy, cortical stimulation and brain mapping, laser interstitial thermal therapy (LITT), robotic surgery, and 5-ALA fluorescence-guided tumor surgery. He served as a clinical research fellow where his research efforts focused on neuro-oncology, spine, socioeconomics, and surgical simulation publishing several peer-reviewed journal articles and book chapters. Sarkiss was the first neurosurgeon to bring advanced brain tumor surgery and care to Kern County, California. He has presented his work at numerous national and international meetings and was an invited speaker at the American Association of Neurological Surgeons, Congress of Neurological Surgeons, and the World Federation of Neurological Surgeons. Dr. Sarkiss has won many awards including The Kalmon D. Post, MD Neurosurgery Publication Award for his research. He is a fellow of the American College of Surgeons, the American Association of Neurological Surgeons, the Congress of Neurological Surgeons, and the Royal Society of Medicine. He previously served as System Medical Director for Neurosurgery and Neuro-Oncology for Advocate Health System in Wisconsin, where he was voted as a top neurosurgeon in consecutive years.

== Waukesha Christmas parade attack ==
Sarkiss was one of the first responders during the Waukesha Christmas parade attack in November 2021 and performed brain surgery on a parade participant who was a member of the famous Milwaukee Dancing Grannies, who lost four of their members during the attack.

== Book chapters ==
- Madarash HO, Sarkiss CA, Rasouli JJ, Schlachter L, Costa AB, Pain M, Bederson JB. "Surgical Simulation." Youmans and Winn Neurological Surgery. 8th ed. Ed. H. Richard Winn. Philadelphia: Elsevier Saunders, 2022.
- Sarkiss CA, Shrivastava RK, Post KD. "Pituitary Tumors." Endocrine Surgery, 2nd ed. Ed. Demetrius Pertsemlidis, et al. London: CRC Press, Taylor & Francis Group, Informa, 2017.
- Skandalakis G, Ladner TR, Sarkiss CA, Hadjipanayis CG. "Planum/Tuberculum Meningiomas: Keyhole Craniotomy." Endoscopic and Keyhole Cranial Surgery. 1st ed. Eds. James Evans, Tyler Kenning, Christopher Farrell, and Varun Kshettry. New York: Springer Science, 2017.
- Sarkiss CA, Rasouli JJ, Hadjipanayis CG. "Intraoperative Imaging of Glioblastoma." Glioblastoma: Molecular and Genetic Origins, Standards of Care, and Innovations. 1st ed. Eds. Steven Brem and Kalil G. Abdullah. Philadelphia: Elsevier Saunders, 2016.
- Sarkiss CA, Rasouli J, Selman WR, Bederson JB. "Surgical Simulation and Robotic Surgery." Youmans and Winn Neurological Surgery 7/e. 7th ed. Ed. H. Richard Winn. Philadelphia: Elsevier Saunders, 2016.
- Sarkiss CA, Yong RL. "Reoperation for Recurrent Glioblastoma." Glioblastoma Multiforme: Neurological Symptoms, Therapeutic Management, and Life Expectancy. 1st ed. Ed. Isabelle M. Germano. New York: Nova Science Publishers, 2015.

== Select publications ==
- Sarkiss CA, Germano IM. Machine Learning in Neuro-Oncology: Can Data Analysis from 5,346 Patients Change Decision Making Paradigms? World Neurosurg. 2019; pii: S1878-8750(19)30141-X. doi: 10.1016/j.wneu.2019.01.046.
- Shah AH, Semonche A, Eichberg DG, Borowy V, Luther E, Sarkiss CA, Morell A, Mahavadi AK, Ivan ME, Komotar RJ. The Role of Laser Interstitial Thermal Therapy in Surgical Neuro-Oncology: Series of 100 Consecutive Patient. Neurosurgery, 2019 Nov 19. DOI: 10.1093/neuros/nyz424.
- Eichberg DG, Shah AH, Di L, Semonche AM, Jimsheleishvili G, Luther EM, Sarkiss CA, Levi AD, Gultekin SH, Komotar RJ, Ivan ME. Stimulated Raman histology for rapid and accurate intraoperative diagnosis of CNS tumors: prospective blinded study. J Neurosurg, 2019 Dec 6:1-7. doi: 10.3171/2019.9.JNS192075.
- Sarkiss CA, Riley KJ, Hernandez CM, Oermann EK, Bederson JB, Shrivastava RK. Program Ranking by Academic Productivity of U.S. Neurosurgery Residents as Measured by H-Index with Correlation to Faculty Productivity. Neurosurgery. 2017;80:975-84.
- Sarkiss CA, Philemond S, Lee J, Sobotka S, Holloway TD, Moore M, Costa AB, Gordon E, Bederson JB. Neurosurgical Skills Assessment: Measuring Technical Proficiency in Neurosurgery Residents through Intraoperative Video Evaluations. World Neurosurg. 2016;89:1-8.
- Sarkiss CA, Lee J, Papin JA, Geer EB, Banik R, Rucker JC, Oudheusden B, Govindaraj S, Shrivastava RK. Pilot study on early post-operative (POD#1) discharge in pituitary adenoma patients: The effect of socioeconomic factors and the benefit of specialized pituitary centers. J Neurol Surg B Skull Base. 2015;76:323-30.
- Sarkiss CA, Papin J, Yao Y, Lee J, Sefcik, RK, Oermann EK, Gordon E, Post KD, Bederson JB, Shrivastava RK. Day of Surgery Impacts Outcome: Rehabilitation Utilization on Hospital Length of Stay in Patients Undergoing Elective Meningioma Resection. World Neurosurgery. 2016;93:127-32.
- Sarkiss CA, Fogg GA, Skovrlj B, Cho SK, Caridi JM. To Operate or Not?: A Literature Review of Surgical Outcomes in 95 Patients with Parkinson's Disease Undergoing Spine Surgery. Clin Neurol Neurosurg. 2015;134:122-5.
- Sarkiss CA, Sarkar R, Yong W, Lazareff JA. Time dependent pattern of cellular characteristics causing ventriculoperitoneal shunt failure in children. Clin Neurol Neurosurg. 2014;127:30-2.
