= Richard J. Koubek =

American engineer

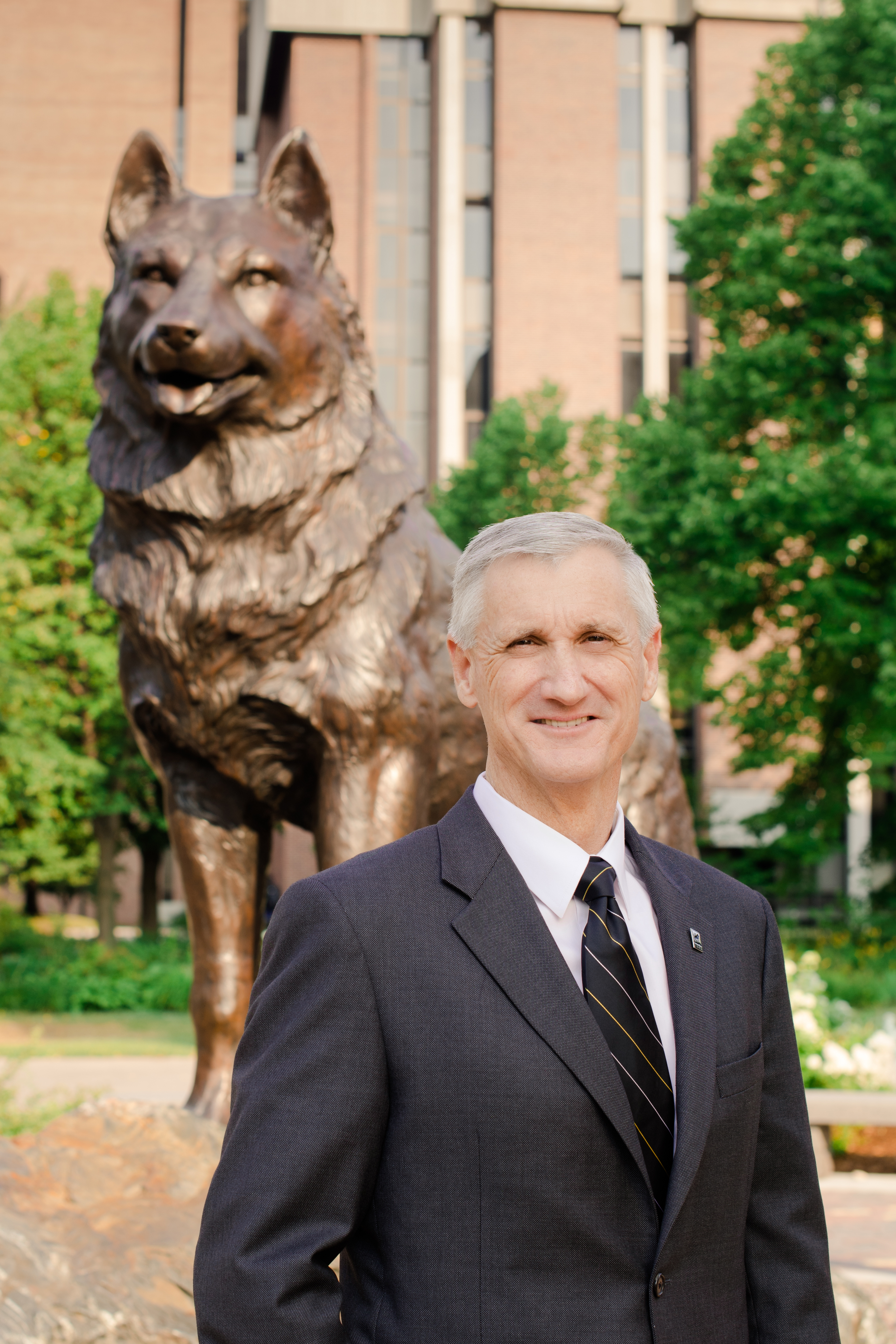
- Koubek in 2018

11th President of Michigan Technological University
- Incumbent
- Assumed office 2018
- Preceded by: Glenn Mroz

Personal details
- Born: Berwyn, Illinois
- Education: Oral Roberts University (BA); Northeastern Illinois University (BS); Purdue University (MS, PhD)

Richard John Koubek is an American engineer and university administrator serving as the 11th president of Michigan Technological University since 2018. He formerly served as executive vice president and provost at Louisiana State University.

Prior to joining LSU, Koubek was professor and head of the Harold and Inge Marcus Department of Industrial and Manufacturing Engineering at the Pennsylvania State University. He has also held the posts of professor and chair for the Department of Biomedical, Industrial and Human Factors Engineering, as well as Associate Dean for Research and Graduate Studies for the College of Engineering and Computer Science at Wright State University.

== Biography ==
Richard John Koubek was born in Berwyn, Illinois and grew up in California's San Fernando Valley and Farmington Hills, Michigan before returning to the Chicago area during his high school years. He received a BA from Oral Roberts University in 1981, in biblical literature, with a minor in chemistry. He received a BS in psychology from Northeastern Illinois University in 1982, and then completed his MS and PhD in industrial engineering from Purdue in 1985 and 1987, respectively.

Koubek began his academic career as a faculty member in the Wright State University College of Engineering and Computer Science. He later served six years as an assistant and associate professor in the School of Industrial Engineering at Purdue University, and then as a full professor and chair of the Department of Biomedical, Industrial and Human Factors Engineering. In 2009, Koubek became the Dean of the LSU College of Engineering. He was named executive vice president & provost at Louisiana State University in 2015 until being named President of Michigan Technological University in late 2018.

Koubek currently serves on the board of directors for the Central Collegiate Hockey Association, the Michigan Association of State Universities and InvestUP.
