= David George Gordon =

American naturalist and non-fiction writer (1950–2026)

- Gordon in 2014
- Born: April 15, 1950; Chicago, Illinois, U.S.
- Died: August 4, 2026 (aged 76); Tacoma, Washington, U.S.
- Education: Northeastern Illinois University
- Occupations: Naturalist, non-fiction writer
- Spouse(s): Maureen Cleary (divorced) Mari Mullen (divorced) Karen Luke Fildes (m. 2009)
- Relatives: Stuart Gordon (brother); Carolyn Purdy-Gordon (sister-in-law)

David George Gordon (April 15, 1950 – August 4, 2026), nicknamed "The Bug Chef", was an American naturalist and non-fiction writer.

== Early life and career ==
Gordon was born in Chicago, Illinois, on April 15, 1950, the son of Bernard Gordon, a cosmetics factory worker, and Rosalie Sabath, a high school English teacher and social worker. He was the brother of Stuart Gordon, a film director. He attended the University of Wisconsin-Madison, but dropped out. He moved to California, and he majored in biology at Northeastern Illinois University, graduating in 1980. During his college years, he worked as an aquarist at the Shedd Aquarium, a public aquarium in his hometown.

He began cooking insects in 1997, and he appeared in the television talk shows Nightline, Late Night with Conan O'Brien, The Late Late Show with James Corden and The View. In 1998, he wrote The Eat-A-Bug Cookbook, a cookbook of insect recipes. He also wrote Heaven on the Half Shell, The Sasquatch Seeker's Field Manual, and The Compleat Cockroach. The New York Times named him "a young Einstein with a bushy beard, tousled hair and round spectacles".

== Personal life and death ==
Gordon's first two marriages, to Maureen Cleary and Mari Mullen, both ended in divorce. His third marriage, to Karen Luke Fildes, a painter, lasted from 2009 until his death. She illustrated several of his books.

Gordon died in Tacoma, Washington, on August 4, 2026, at the age of 76.
