= Ella McSweeney =

Irish broadcaster (born 1978)

- Born: 31 October 1978 (age 47)
- Education: Trinity College, Dublin (TCD)
- Occupations: Food & farming reporter & journalist

Ella McSweeney (born 31 October 1978) is an Irish food and farming journalist and reporter. She has worked for BBC, RTÉ (Ireland's national broadcaster) and the Guardian newspaper. She graduated from Trinity College, Dublin and is a post graduate student in food policy at City University, London.

== Early life ==
Ella McSweeney grew up in Ireland. She graduated with a first-class honours degree in science – specialising in zoology – from Trinity College, Dublin.

== Career ==
=== Radio ===
McSweeney studied science at Trinity College, Dublin, specialising in zoology.^{[1]} She began working for RTÉ Radio in 2000, producing Future Tense and Nature's Web. She then spent three years at BBC radio, television and online media in Belfast and London before returning to RTÉ in 2004. She presented and produced a number of RTÉ series, including The Green Light, Farm Week, RTÉ's Big Science Debate, as well as science documentaries for RTÉ's Documentary on One slot. From 2004 to 2007, McSweeney travelled around rural Ireland recording her wildlife and walking series Shanks Mare.^{[2]} She also made the marine series Into the Deep, and the award-winning science series Mind Matters.^{[3]} She has reported for BBC Radio 4's Farming Today and also the BBC Food Programme. In 2013 she presented a BBC World Service documentary on vertical farming and in 2015 she went to Kentucky to make a radio documentary on Wendell Berry which was broadcast on BBC Radio 4.

=== Television ===
McSweeney has presented RTÉ's award-winning food and farming series Ear to the Ground since 2008.^{[4]} In 2009, she presented the lifestyle TV series Living Lightly on RTÉ.^{[5]} She was a reporter for RTÉ television's investigative consumer series The Consumer Show in 2015. She presented a one-hour factual documentary on thoroughbred horses called "Power in the Blood" for RTÉ. In July 2020, she presented RTÉ's six-part COVID-19 business series Open for Business alongside Richard Curran.

=== Journalism ===
McSweeney has written for the Guardian, Irish Times, Irish Examiner and other publications. In 2015, she was part of a Guardian team which published a year-long investigation into the use of migrant workers in the Irish fishing industry.

=== Awards ===
In 2000, McSweeney was named Young Science Journalist of the Year for a documentary she made on the human genome project.^{[6]} Her work on Mind Matters earned her a national Phonographic Performance Ireland (PPI) Radio Award in 2007.^{[7]} She has won two national Agricultural Journalism Awards in Ireland for radio and print journalism, and in 2015 she won the International Federation of Agricultural Journalist star prize for broadcasting for her report on antibiotic use in Irish agriculture.
