= The Eat-A-Bug Cookbook =

Insect cookbook

- Author: David George Gordon
- Language: English
- Publication date: 1998
- Publication place: United States
- Media type: Print (Hardcover and paperback)

The Eat-A-Bug Cookbook is a 1998 cookbook of insect recipes by David George Gordon.

== Book summary ==
The book has recipes that are organized by bug and it says how to store the insects. Some of the insects are crickets, grasshoppers, locusts, termites, ants, and bees. There is also a list of references, places to purchase insects, and organizations that put on insect events at which bugs are available to sample. The book says that U.S. Food and Drug Administration allows as many as 56 insect parts in every peanut butter and jelly sandwich, up to 60 aphids in 3 1/2 ounces of frozen broccoli, and two or three fruit-fly maggots per 200 grams of tomato juice.

== Reception ==
A California Rare Fruit Growers, Inc. review says, "I think this book is a good value and that more eating of insects should be encouraged. My own limited experiences eating larvae and scorpions have been pleasant enough." A Discover review says, "Insects aside, Gordon's recipes are tasty and well-chosen--as are the many informative slices of arthropod lore. Bon appetit!"

== See also ==
- Entomophagy
- Man Eating Bugs
