= Candy Dawson Boyd =

American writer, activist, and educator

- Born: Marguerite Cecille Dawson; August 8, 1946 (age 80); Chicago, Illinois, United States
- Education: Northeastern Illinois University; University of California, Berkeley
- Writing career
- Language: English
- Period: Contemporary
- Genre: Young adult fiction

Candy Dawson Boyd (born August 8, 1946) is an American writer, activist, and educator. She is an author of more than six children's books focused on African-American youth.

== Early life and education ==
Boyd was born in 1946 in Chicago, Illinois. Her birth name is Marguerite Cecille Dawson. Her parents were Mary Ruth Ridley and Julian Dawson. Boyd had two siblings and she was the oldest of the three. Her mother and father divorced. Boyd was raised by her mother. They lived in South Chicago. Boyd attended racially segregated elementary and middle schools. The library she used was also segregated. The library books were used from white schools that no longer wanted them. She graduated from high school in 1962.

After high school she went to Northeastern Illinois University. She dropped out of college to get involved with the Civil Rights Movement. She worked for the Southern Christian Leadership Conference. She eventually graduated in 1967 with her Bachelor of Arts. After graduation, Boyd taught locally in Chicago. She moved to Berkeley, California in 1971 and commenced work towards her master's degree. She received her master's in 1978. She received the Ph.D in 1982. Both degrees came from the University of California, Berkeley. Boyd also worked for Rainbow/PUSH.

== Career ==
While teaching in California, she became concerned about the lack of quality books for children. She started writing children's books. She took children's writing classes at the Berkeley Public Library. She then started to work full-time in training teachers. As of 2007, she was serving as director of Reading and Language Arts at Saint Mary's College of California. She is the first African-American to have tenure at Saint Mary's. Boyd is divorced. She lives in Chicago.

=== Writing ===
Boyd writes children's books that are "inspiring, positive, and realistic." Among the themes in her work are love, friendship, death, rejection, personal responsibility, taking care of others, and coping with failure. Many of her books focus around African-American youth and aim to fight African-American stereotypes. Her books also pull influence from her experience in the Civil Rights Movement. Her first book was A Circle of Gold. The book was awarded a Coretta Scott King Award.

== Recognition ==
- 1992, Professor of the Year, St. Mary's College of California

== Works ==
- Breadsticks & Blessing Places. New York: Simon & Schuster Books for Young Readers (1985). ISBN 0027092909
- Charlie Pippin. New York: Simon & Schuster Books for Young Readers (1987). ISBN 1442452323
- Chevrolet Saturdays. London: Puffin (1995). ISBN 0140368590
- Circle of Gold. New York: Scholastic (1984). ISBN 0590401491
- Daddy, Daddy, Be There. New York: Philomel (1995). ISBN 0399227458
- A Different Beat. London: Puffin (1996). ISBN 0140365826
- Fall Secrets. London: Puffin (1994). ISBN 0140365834
- Forever Friends. London: Puffin (1986). ISBN 0140320776
- (with Peter Afflerbach, James Beers, Camille Blachowicz, and Deborah Diffily) Scott Foresman Reading: Fantastic Voyage. Glenview: Scott Foresman & Co. (2000). ISBN 0673596478
