= Narsai David =

American chef, radio host and restaurateur (1936–2024)

- Born: Narsai Michael David; June 26, 1936; South Bend, Indiana, U.S.
- Died: June 20, 2024 (aged 87)
- Education: University of California, Berkeley
- Occupations: Businessman, food writer, food radio host, restaurant owner, market owner, catering company owner
- Culinary career
- Previous restaurant(s): Hy's Restaurant, Oakland, California Potluck Restaurant (1959–1972), Berkeley, California, Narsai's (1972–1986), Kensington, California
- Website: http://narsai.com

Narsai Michael David (June 26, 1936 – June 20, 2024) was an American chef, author, host of a radio show on food, and a winery owner in the San Francisco Bay Area of California. He was a former food writer, restaurant and market owner, and the owner of a catering company.

== Biography ==
Narsai Michael David was born in South Bend, Indiana to Assyrian parents Michael Khanno David and Shulamith Sayad. He was raised in Turlock, California and graduated from Turlock High School.

He attended the University of California, Berkeley, studying math and pre-med. During college he supported himself by working at Hy's Restaurant in Oakland. After college he owned a printing company for two years. In 1959, he took a job at the Potluck Restaurant in Berkeley, California, eventually becoming a partner. He remained at the Potluck Restaurant until 1972.

In 1970, he began a catering business. Among his first clients was Bill Graham, the legendary San Francisco rock impresario, for whom Narsai catered events for all major bands including The Rolling Stones. David catered the backstage meals for the many bands who appeared, and stage and sound crews at the California Jam concert in 1974. He has since catered many special events, some for the British royal family on their visits to San Francisco.

In 1972, he opened his restaurant, Narsai's, in the upscale community of Kensington, on the northern tip of Berkeley. The restaurant was described by The New York Times as having one of the finest wine cellars in the world. Narsai's Market was opened next door, from 1978 until 1985. Narsai's restaurant closed in 1986. On the shelves at Narsai's Market were many imported and gourmet products, several of which are still made exclusively for him using his own recipes and bearing his distinctive label.

David owned one vineyard in the Napa Valley, Narsai David Estates, and produced his own Cuvée and Cabernet Sauvignon.

In the 1980s until the 1990s, he had a food and cooking column in the San Francisco Chronicle. He was the KCBS Food and Wine Editor; and has appeared on radio and television. David suffered declining health after a fall and died on June 20, 2024, at the age of 87.
