= COVID Tracker Ireland =

Irish COVID-19 app

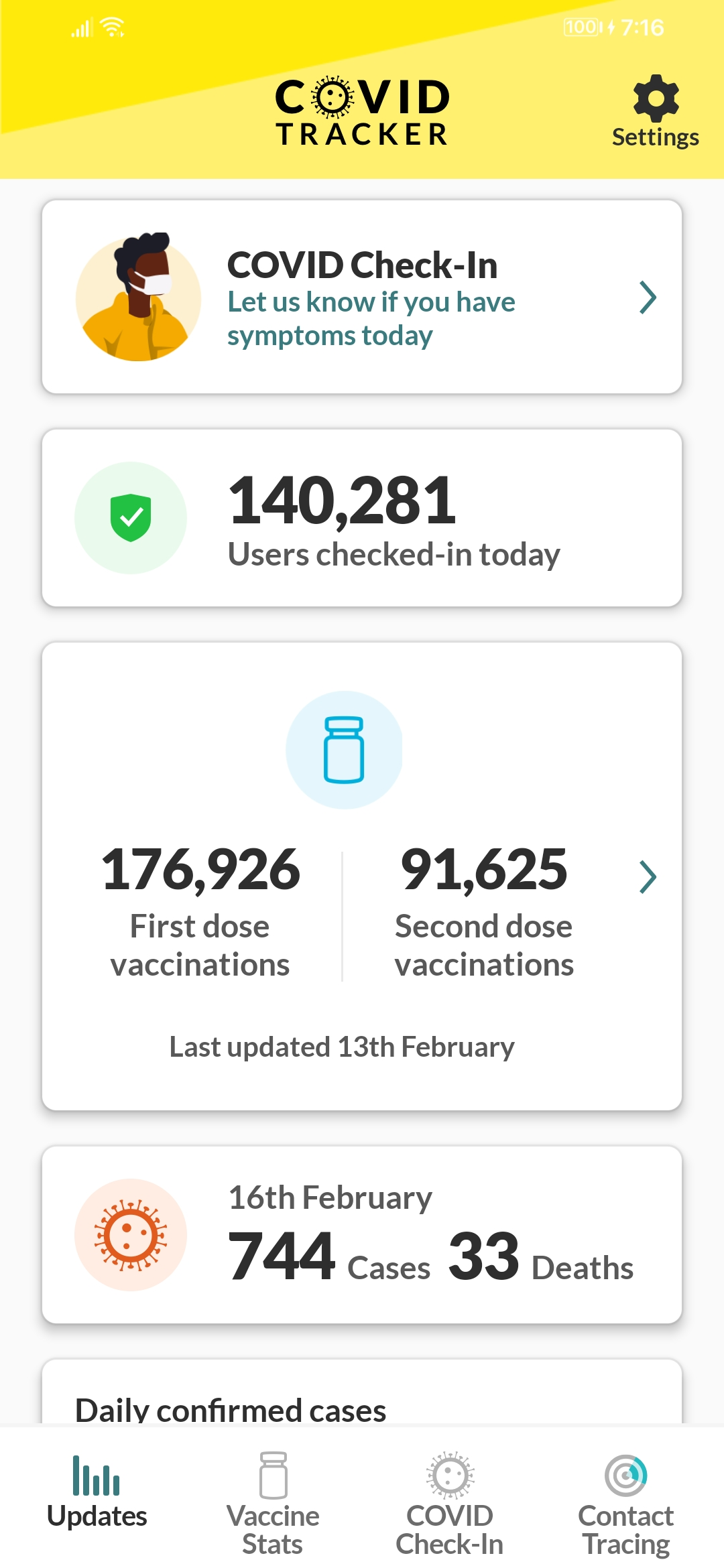
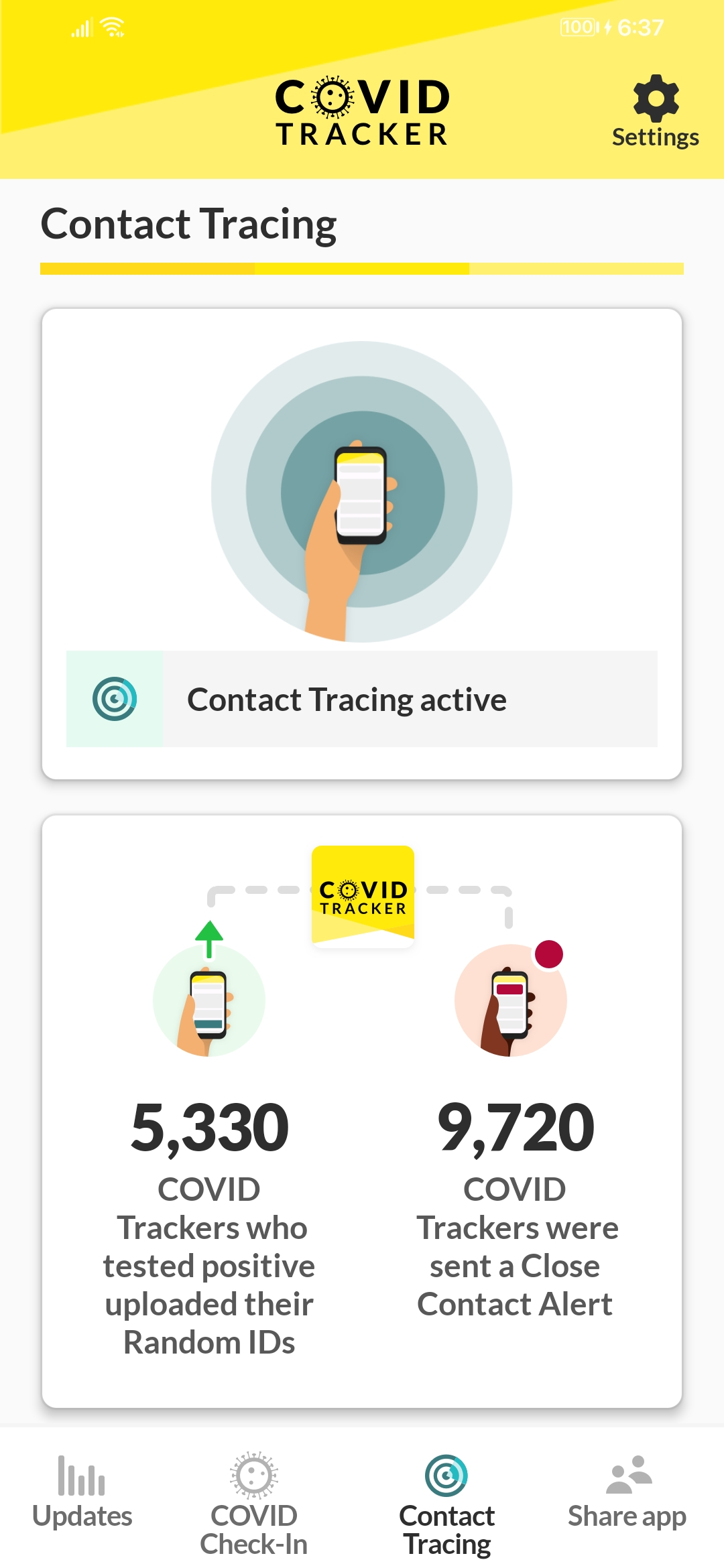
- Screenshot Home screen Contact tracing section
- Developers: Government of Ireland; Health Service Executive (HSE); NearForm
- Release: 7 July 2020; 6 years ago
Stable release
- Android: 1.0.8 / 30 November 2021; 4 years ago
- iOS: 1.0.8 / 1 December 2021; 4 years ago
- Operating system: Android, iOS
- Standard: Exposure Notification framework
- Available in: English, Irish, Arabic, French, Latvian, Lithuanian, Polish, Portuguese
- Type: Digital contact tracing COVID-19 apps
- Licence: MIT License
- Website: covidtracker.gov.ie
- Repository: github.com/HSEIreland/covid-tracker-app

COVID Tracker Ireland is a digital contact tracing app released by the Irish Government and the Health Service Executive on 7 July 2020 to prevent the spread of COVID-19 in Ireland. The app uses ENS and Bluetooth technology to determine whether a user have been a close contact of someone for more than 15 minutes who tested positive for COVID-19. On 8 July, the app reached one million registered users within 36 hours after its launch, representing more than 30% of the population of Ireland and over a quarter of all smartphone users in the country. As of August 2021, over 3,030,000 people have downloaded the app.

== History ==
The development process of the COVID Tracker app began on 22 March 2020 when the Health Service Executive (HSE) contracted a contact tracing app for Ireland to be built, using existing Bluetooth technology in smartphones to support contact tracing. The €850,000 project involved representatives from the Department of Health, the Economic and Social Research Institute (ESRI), the Garda Síochána, the Irish Army and Science Foundation Ireland. The contracted developer, NearForm, contacted Apple and Google in May 2020 for beta access to the two companies' Exposure Notifications System, to protect the anonymity of users whose data is collected, and to ensure user consent before any upload of personal info to contact tracers. Within three months of development, the team had a secure, tested and reliable contact tracing app that worked and was ready to be deployed on a national scale. The COVID Tracker app was launched by the Government of Ireland and the HSE on 7 July 2020 with 862,000 downloads on the first day of launch.

The Northern Ireland StopCOVID NI and Scottish Protect Scotland apps are based on the same NearForm technology and interoperate with it. NearForm have made the app source-code freely available under the MIT License. In September 2020, NearForm deployed localised versions of the app under the "COVID Alert" brand in the U.S. states of Delaware, New Jersey, New York and Pennsylvania.

On 19 October, the COVID Tracker app became one of the first wave of national apps linked with other countries across the European Union after being linked with similar contact tracing apps from Italy and Germany.

In July 2021, the app was updated to allow people to store and display the EU Digital COVID Certificate.

== Contact tracing ==
The COVID Tracker app uses Bluetooth Low Energy and Google's and Apple's Exposure Notifications System to generate anonymous IDs to log:

- Any phone users are in close contact with that also has the app installed.
- The distance between users' phone and another app users' phone.
- The length of time users' phone is near another app users' phone.

Every two hours the app downloads a list of anonymous codes which have been shared with the Health Service Executive (HSE) by other people using the app who have tested positive for COVID-19. If a user have been closer than 2 metres for more than 15 minutes with any of these phones, that user will get an alert notification on their phone.

The app requires users to turn on the Exposure Notifications service and will only be available to those with phones running Android 6.0 Marshmallow or higher, or iOS 13.5 or higher.

== Privacy and data ==
The Health Service Executive claims that the COVID Tracker app protects the privacy of all users and was designed to protect users' privacy.

=== Concerns ===
On 18 July 2020, researchers at Trinity College, Dublin issued a report claiming user privacy is not protected adequately in the COVID Tracking app if used with Google Play Services. The report shows how Google Play Services used on Android devices sends highly sensitive personal data to Google servers every 20 minutes including users' IMEI, hardware serial number, SIM serial number, handset phone number and a Gmail address, which potentially allows for IP address-based location tracking of the phone. The researchers at Trinity College described the revealed data transfers as "extremely troubling from a privacy viewpoint" while the Irish Council for Civil Liberties described it as being "completely opaque to users and the HSE themselves".

== Android battery drainage ==
On 9 August 2020, it was announced that the HSE was working with Google to identify and fix phone battery issues after the COVID Tracker app was reportedly draining Android users' batteries in 5 hours. On 10 August, it was reported that 10% of Android users (86,000) uninstalled the app, following battery drainage issues. On 11 August, the HSE announced that an update had been rolled out to 70% of Android phones, which is expected to fix the issue, and that 45,000 people had reinstalled the app in the last few days.

== See also ==
- COVID-19 apps
- COVID-19 pandemic in Ireland
- Health Service Executive
