= Ricardo J. Komotar =

American neurosurgeon

Ricardo Jorge Komotar is an American neurosurgeon who specializes in the field of brain tumors. He serves as director of the University of Miami Brain Tumor Initiative, director of the UM Neurosurgery Residency Program, and director of the UM Surgical Neurooncology Fellowship Program.

== Education ==
Komotar's graduated with a B.S. in neuroscience from Duke University. During this time, Komotar was awarded the opportunity to conduct neuropharmacology research at Oxford University in England for a year. He then obtained his medical degree with highest honors from The Johns Hopkins University School of Medicine and completed his neurosurgical internship/residency at Columbia University. Komotar went on to specialize in brain tumors by completing a surgical neurooncology fellowship at Memorial Sloan-Kettering Cancer Center.

== Career and publications ==
Komotar is co-author of the textbook Fundamentals of Operative Techniques in Neurosurgery. He has written more than 500 scientific articles. He serves on the executive committee for the Congress of Neurological Surgeons and the executive board for the AANS/CNS Joint Section on Tumors.

== Charity work ==
Komotar is founder and director of the Annual Neurosurgery Charity Softball Tournament, a benefit event meant to help raise money for brain tumor research. This event was launched in 2003 while Komotar was an intern at Columbia University Medical Center. The international fundraiser has expanded to include over 40 top neurological institutes from across the U.S., Canada and Puerto Rico.
