= Juliana Taimoorazy =

Assyrian activist

- ܓ̰ܘܠܝܢܐ ܬܡܪ̈ܙܐ
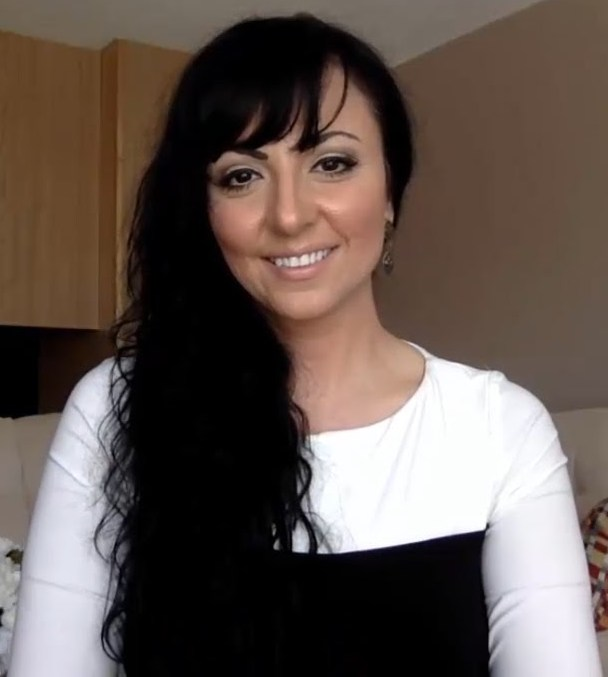
- Taimoorazy in 2017

1st President of the Iraqi Christian Relief Council
- Incumbent
- Assumed office 2007
- Preceded by: Position established

Personal details
- Born: 1973 (age 52–53) Tehran, Imperial State of Iran (now Iran)
- Citizenship: American
- Education: Northeastern Illinois University

Juliana Taimoorazy (Syriac: ܓ̰ܘܠܝܢܐ ܬܡܪ̈ܙܐ; born 1973) is an Assyrian American activist from Iran. She is the founder and current president of the Iraqi Christian Relief Council, a position that she's held since its inception in 2007. From 2015 to 2020, she was a senior fellow with the Philos Project, an organization that aims to increase Christian engagement in the Middle East. She became a refugee when her family left Iran in 1989, and was subsequently granted asylum in the US at the age of 17 in 1990.

== Early life and background ==
Juliana Taimoorazy was born in 1973 in the Imperial State of Iran to an Assyrian family. Her great-grandfather was a victim of the Assyrian genocide who was killed in a death camp, and two of her great-aunts were raped and killed during the genocide by Kurdish fighters.

Taimoorazy fondly describes her life before the Islamic Revolution in Iran as one that granted religious and cultural freedom to Assyrians. She was six years old at the time of the revolution. Afterwards, she experienced numerous cases of institutional and social discrimination. At school, she was often told that she would "burn in Hell" for her Christian faith. Other students often attempted to force her to recite the Shahada, which she would refuse. Her mother was also told shortly after the revolution that she, "will see what we will do to you now that your father, your protector, is gone."

Believing that their daughter had no future in a country that would discriminate against her for being an Assyrian, a Christian, and a woman, Taimoorazy's parents ultimately made the decision to smuggle her out of Iran at the age of 17. In order to avoid ridicule for fleeing the country, her parents began selling their belongings under the guise of financing the construction of a new house outside of Tehran. They were actually raising money to transport Taimoorazy out of the country, which included the cost of paying smugglers, and a hotel to live in for six months while the smuggling was organized. All in all, $25,000 was spent on the smuggling effort. After finding a smuggler, Taimoorazy was smuggled from Iran to Switzerland, then from Switzerland to Germany. She eventually settled in the United States in 1990.

Aside from English, Taimoorazy fluently speaks both the Assyrian and Persian languages. She attended Northeastern Illinois University.

== Assyrian activism ==
Due to further persecution of Assyrians resulting from the United States invasion of Iraq, Taimoorazy began volunteering with Catholic charities in 2006 in order to mentor young Assyrian women who came to the United States from Iraq.

Taimoorazy was inspired to start the Iraqi Christian Relief Council (ICRC) in 2007 after being told by then-Cardinal Francis George of Chicago that it was her calling to do so. Specifically, he told her, "You have to start an organization that raises awareness among Americans about who the Christians of Iraq are. She, along with many Assyrians living in Iraq whom she'd spoken to, were also dismayed at the lack of advocacy from Western churches on behalf of the Assyrian Christians. She has described the level of awareness of these issues among Western churches as, "low" but "slowly getting better."

According to Taimoorazy, the ICRC did not initially receive very much attention from American officials until the 2014 ISIS invasion of the Assyrian homeland. Since the invasion, Taimoorazy was able to greatly expand the work of the ICRC due to increased funding and publicity. She credits the rise of social media as being a key factor in the increased awareness of Assyrians in their homeland, by both displaying the dire need that they are in, and displaying the brutality of those who persecute them, such as ISIS.

Taimoorazy now travels to and from Iraq regularly on humanitarian missions, and the ICRC regularly distributes humanitarian aid to Assyrians in Iraq through the Assyrian Aid Society and the Dominican Sisters of Saint Catherine of Siena in Northern Iraq. In the year 2016, the ICRC provided humanitarian aid to 95,000 Assyrian Christians in Iraq. As a senior fellow with the Philos Project, she was also able to spearhead their Digital Nineveh Campaign, which raised funds to provide laptops to Assyrian students in the Nineveh Plains.

Taimoorazy has also met with Iraqi parliamentarians to discuss the creation of a Christian province in Iraq. She also discussed the matter with media figures as well, including an interview with Tucker Carlson on Tucker Carlson Tonight.

In 2017, Taimoorazy criticized the Kurdistan Regional Government (KRG) independence referendum for its negative impact on the Assyrian population of the area, as well as the threats of violence issued by the KRG against Assyrians who protested the referendum.

Taimoorazy has also condemned the government of Turkey for refusing to investigate the disappearances of Assyrian couple Hurmiz and Shimoni Diril. Shimoni's body was later found in a shallow creek. To date, neither the disappearance of Hurmiz nor the death of Shimoni have been investigated by authorities.

Taimoorazy has also supports the passage of House Resolution 537, which would have the United States officially recognize the Assyrian genocide if passed.

In response to the COVID-19 pandemic, Taimoorazy signed a joint letter along with representatives from 27 other Non-governmental organizations calling on Iraqi authorities and the United Nations to implement measures aimed at preventing a humanitarian and security catastrophe in Sinjar, Tel Afar, and the Nineveh Plain. Taimoorazy also announced the launch of the Save Those Who Save Lives Campaign, in which the ICRC pledged a $5,000 donation in order to provide masks for healthcare workers in the United States to combat the pandemic.
