= Open for Business (blog) =

Open for Business (OFB) was an online news blog with a technology focus. It featured articles on topics including computers, technology, politics, current events, theology and philosophy. The site also contained a fiction section with short stories and poetry.

== History ==
OFB was founded on October 5, 2001 as the "open-source migration guide". It was started by Timothy R. Butler after a mailing list discussion, and featured articles and white papers discussing migration to Linux. Originally, OFB featured very little original content, instead mimicking Slashdot and similar sites that included little more than a few small comments on the articles posted. Steven Hatfield helped add postings to the site.

The site then started to add free and open source software news. About a month after the site was founded, the first original editorial content appeared and OFB continued to publish approximately one original work per month after that. In late April 2002, Butler announced a relaunch of the site that included a reduction in links to other sites and a further increase in original content. The relaunch also brought forth the first version of a blue sphere logo and the new tagline "the Independent Journal of Open Source Migration".

On July 4, 2002, Open for Business, LinuxandMain.com, KernelTrap and Device Forge's LinuxDevices and DesktopLinux.com formed LinuxDailyNews (LDN), an aggregation site that was intended to help increase the publicity of independent open source news sites. LDN featured a center column that showed story highlights and two side columns that displayed all stories from the member sites in blocks. The site was launched as part of DesktopLinux.com's "wIndependence Day" promotion and had an early spike in popularity following a mention on Slashdot. In subsequent months, the site's traffic decreased. It was taken down in 2004 after a hacker managed to deface the site; although plans existed to restore the site, they were never followed through with and Device Forge assumed the rights to LDN's domain name.

In February 2003, the site finalized its transition to an original content provider, as opposed to a site of links, by moving non-original content to a separate "News Watch" section. New contributing editor Ed Hurst began a series on his switch to FreeBSD in September 2003, beginning a long running series of FreeBSD articles that Hurst continued to add until October 2006. Butler also began OFB's coverage of Mac OS X computers. OFB's second associate editor Eduardo Sánchez returned in mid-2004 as a contributing editor. Hurst was promoted to associate editor simultaneously.

The site continued in a similar fashion, with its mix of coverage on Linux, BSD and Mac OS X through early 2006. During this period it changed its motto to "the Independent Journal of Open Standards and Open Source". Due to other obligations, the site's editors ceased writing content for the site in early 2006, though it remained open during this period.

On its fifth anniversary, Butler announced the relaunch of the site on October 5, 2006. The new OFB adopted the site's current general interest focus, de-emphasizing its past emphasis on Open Source and technology. The site changed its purple and blue, PHP-Nuke-based design that had been used with only minor modifications since the site's original launch, to a simpler, content-oriented design using a custom backend. The old site was archived as OFB Classic to preserve access to past articles.

The last article was posted on January 25, 2013.

== Contributors ==
Regular contributors included:

- Timothy R. Butler, editor-in-chief (2001–present).
- Ed Hurst, contributing editor (2003–2004), associate editor (2004–present).
- Eduardo Sánchez, associate editor (2002–2003), contributing editor (2004–present).
- Jason P. Franklin, contributing editor (2007–present).
- Steven Hatfield, associate editor (2001–2002), contributing editor (2003).
- John-Thomas Richards, contributing editor (2002)
