= Northeastern Illinois University =

Public university in Chicago, Illinois, US

- Former names: Cook County Normal School (1867–1896); Chicago Normal School (1896–1938); Chicago Teacher's College (1938–1965); Northeastern Illinois State College (1966–1971)
- Motto: Excellence. Access. Diversity. Community.
- Type: Public university
- Established: September 2, 1867; 159 years ago
- Accreditation: HLC
- Academic affiliations: CUMU
- Endowment: $26 million (2025)
- Budget: $154 million (2025)
- President: Katrina E. Bell-Jordan
- Provost: R. Shayne Cofer (interim)
- Faculty: 441 (fall 2024)
- Administrative staff: 573 (fall 2024)
- Students: 5,778 (fall 2025)
- Undergraduates: 4,246 (fall 2025)
- Postgraduates: 1,532 (fall 2025)
- Location: Chicago, Illinois, United States; 41.980°N 87.718°W
- Campus: 67 acres (27.1 ha); Large city
- Newspaper: The Independent
- Colors: Blue and gold
- Nickname: Golden Eagles
- Sporting affiliations: None
- Mascot: Goldie the Golden Eagle
- Website: www.neiu.edu

Northeastern Illinois University (NEIU) is a public university in Chicago, Illinois, United States. Founded in 1867 by the Cook County Board of Commissioners, it was established as the first teacher training school in Cook County. The main campus is located in the Chicago area of North Park with two other campuses in Chicago. NEIU has one of the longest-running free-form community radio stations, WZRD Chicago 88.3 FM.

== History ==
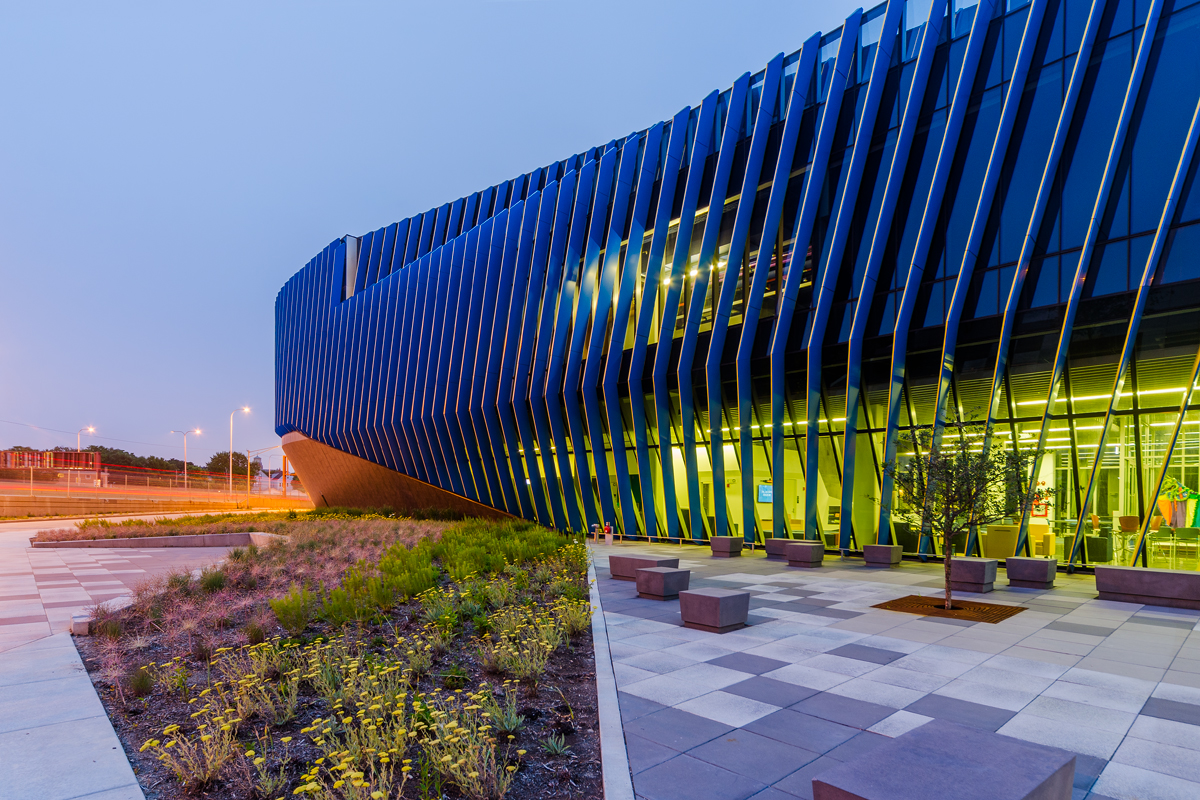
El Centro Campus

The university traces its history to Cook County Normal School to train elementary and high school teachers. It was founded in 1867 in Blue Island, Illinois as Cook County’s first teacher training school. In 1949 the Chicago Teachers College (CTC) separated into two branches with the north branch eventually becoming Northeastern Illinois University and the south branch becoming Chicago State University. The school relocated to the present site at North Park, Chicago in 1961 and changed its name in 1965 to Illinois Teachers' College: Chicago North when control of CTC passed into the hands of the State of Illinois.

In 1967, the Illinois Legislature acted to remove the title of “teachers college” from all state colleges and universities and the college became Northeastern Illinois State College.

In 1971, the school became Northeastern Illinois University after it was granted university status and was given a mandate by the Illinois Legislature "to offer such courses of instruction as shall best serve to qualify teachers for the schools of the State; and to offer such other courses of instruction, conduct such research and offer such public services as are prescribed by the Board of Governors of State Colleges and Universities or its successor."

In January 1996, Northeastern Illinois University established its own board of trustees.

In 2014, NEIU was censured by the American Association of University Professors for violating a professor's academic freedom in a tenure denial case.

In September 2016, Northeastern first began to offer on-campus housing for its students. It was constructed on land that was formerly a University parking lot. Initial plans to expand and construct new dormitories on land seized through eminent domain from the neighborhood were delayed because of strenuous objections from the neighborhood, social activists, some of the faculty, students, and alumni. Beginning the pursuit of the neighborhood land in 2014, the properties were acquired by the University through eminent domain in 2016. Construction is still several years away due to decline in student enrollment. In the meantime, long time residences and businesses have been displaced, and the affected buildings sit empty.

In the fall 2026 semester NEIU introduced its first doctoral program, a Doctorate in Education (EdD) in Leadership, Equity and Inquiry.

== Academics ==
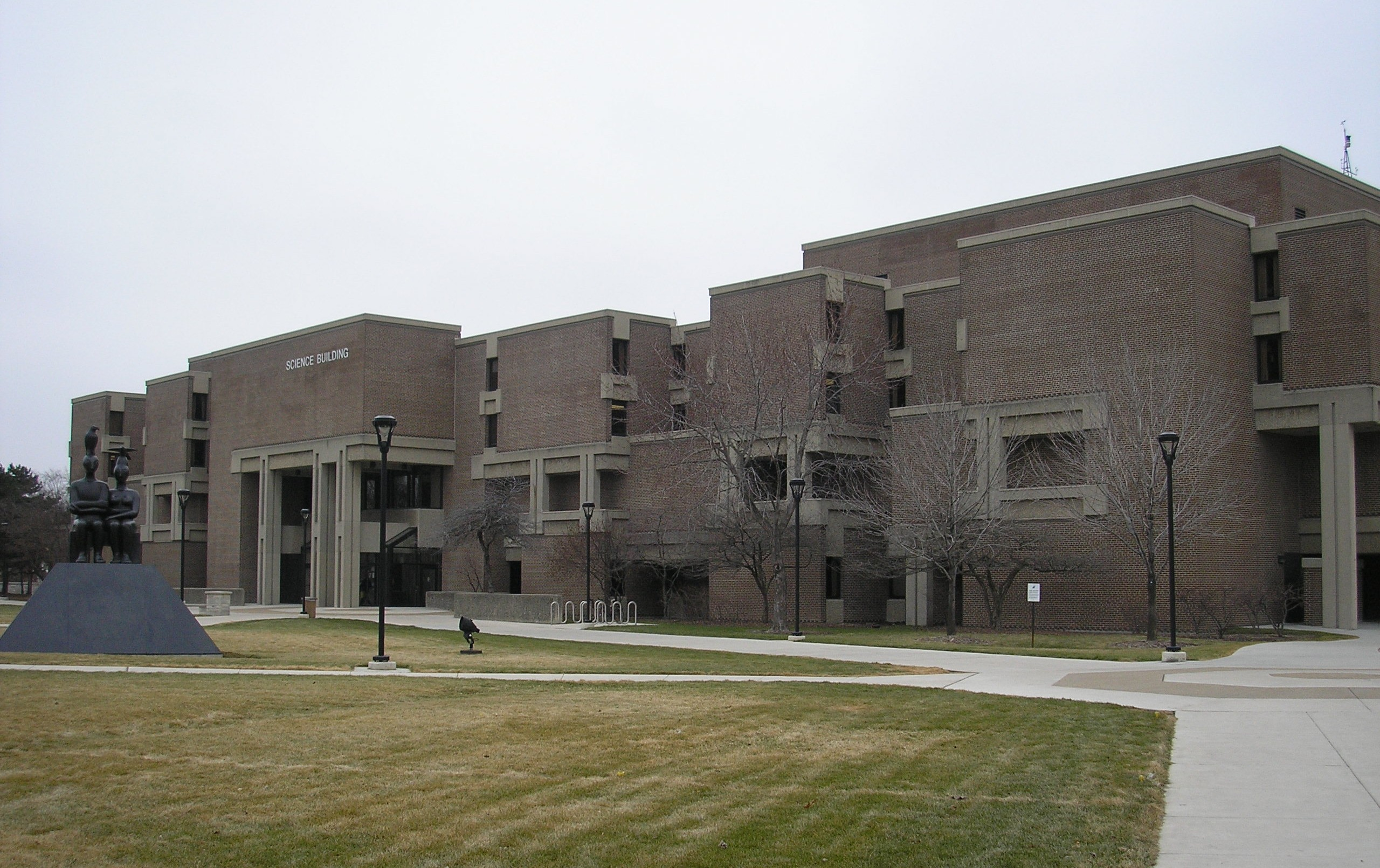
Bernard J. Brommel Hall

Undergraduate and graduate degree programs are offered in four colleges:

- College of Arts and Sciences
- College of Business and Technology
- Daniel L. Goodwin College of Education
- College of Graduate Studies and Research

== Campus ==
NEIU comprises the following instructional buildings:

- Lech Walesa Hall: It has the College of Education, Graduate College, and the International Programs of the university.
- Bernard J Brommel Hall: It has the College of Arts and Science departments.
- Salme Harju Steinberg Fine Arts Center: It has the Communication, Media & Theatre, and Music & Dance departments.
- The Nest: It is NEIU's residence hall. Inside the residence hall students have access to a fitness center and a study area.
- Ronald Williams Library: This is the library on the main campus. The library consists of five floors with study spaces, audio labs, reference and tech services, the University Archives, and the Illinois Regional Archives Depository (IRAD). The building also TRIO Student Support Services, the Academic Success Center, the Center for Teaching and Learning, World Languages and Cultures, the University Ombuds office, and the Veterans Center.
- El Centro: This campus is located adjacent to the Kennedy Expressway (I-90/94) in Chicago’s Avondale community area. The facility offers courses for four programs. It accommodates a student lounge, study spaces, meeting rooms, gathering spaces, computer labs, and a library resource center.
- Jacob H. Carruthers Center of Inner City Studies (CCICS): This campus is located in Chicago’s neighborhood of Bronzeville. The center is the only facility that offers the Inner City Studies and Urban Community Studies programs. Additionally it offers courses for five other programs. This building also has a library on the sixth and seventh floors.
- Alumni Center: It is a meeting place and resource center for all NEIU alums. The center has pictures and memorabilia from famous alums.
- Dr. Mohammad Mossadegh Servant Leaders Hall: It is located in the College of Business and Technology. The hall is the first and only hall in the world named after Mohammad Mossadegh, premier of Iran from 1951 to 1953. This hall was named and established on October 5, 2013.

== Athletics ==
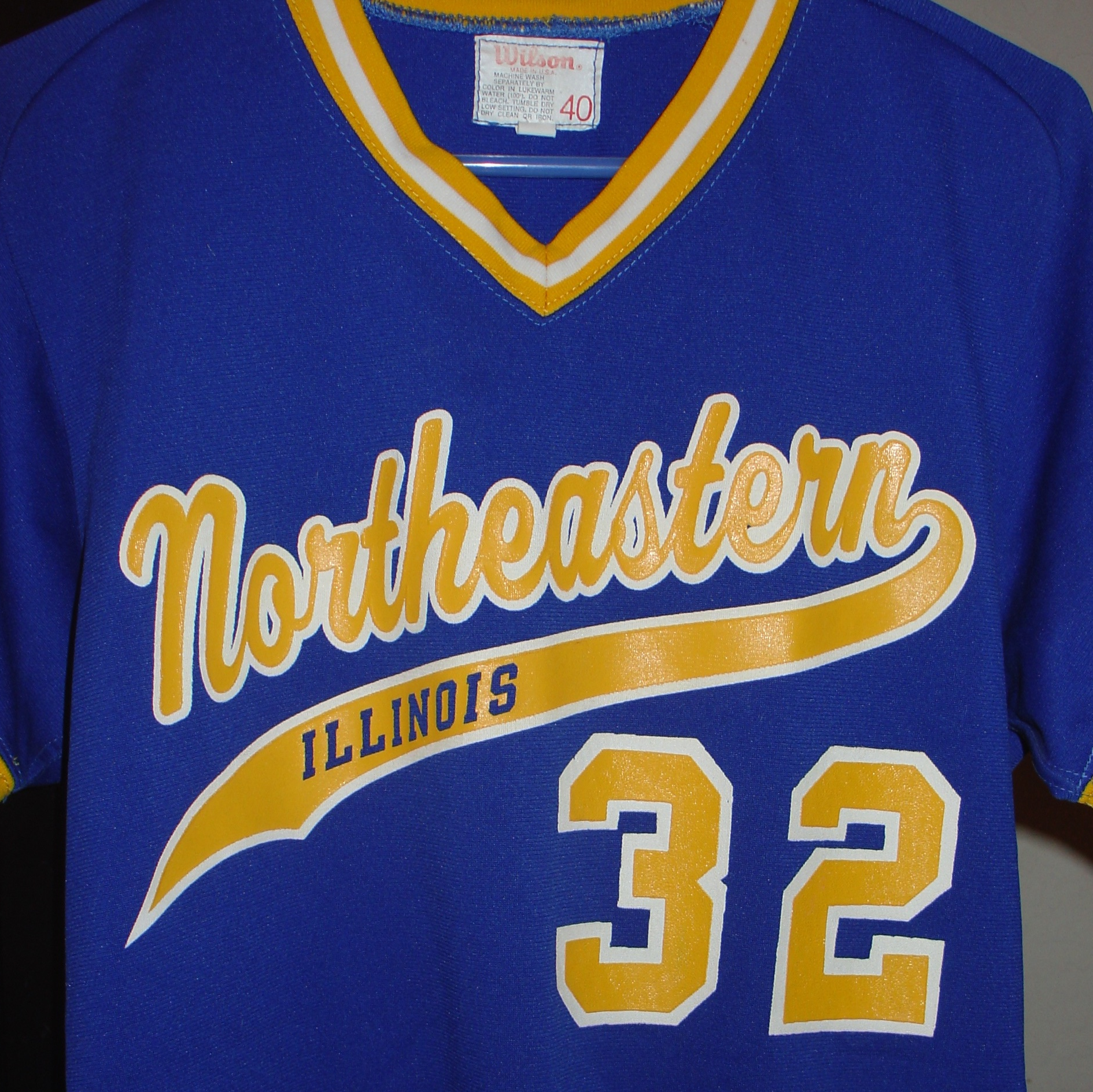
NEIU baseball jersey

Northeastern Illinois competed in the National Association of Intercollegiate Athletics for 20 years until joining the higher profile National Collegiate Athletic Association in 1988. After a transitional season at the Division II level, NEIU moved its athletic program to Division I.

The Golden Eagles played as independents until finding a place in the short-lived East Coast Conference for the 1993–94 season. Northeastern Illinois were then invited to join the Mid-Continent Conference, now known as the Summit League, where it would play for the next four years. The University eliminated all intercollegiate sports in 1998.

The Northeastern Illinois Golden Eagles men's basketball team played from 1988 to 1998 and held home games in the Physical Education Complex.

Chief among the highlights of this era was the baseball team's 1996 Mid-Continent Conference championship and NCAA Tournament bid, where they beat Northern Illinois in a play-in series to reach the tournament. Men's basketball player Andrell Hoard won the ESPN National Slam Dunk Competition, but lost the conference championship to Valparaiso University by one point in a nationally televised game where ingloriously the Golden Eagle's Mascot committed a technical foul by body slamming the other mascot at center count like a linebacker on national TV, making ESPN's daily highlights. The women's basketball coach Denise Taylor was chosen to lead the Utah Starzz of the WNBA in 1997, and women's basketball player Delores Jones was a participant in the 1998 WNBA draft.

The school's football team was a charter member of the Division III Illini-Badger Football Conference, where it won five conference titles before dropping the sport in 1988.

In 1977, a men's club soccer team was formed by students from local soccer organizations around Chicago to compete against college varsities from surrounding region. This club, guided by player/coach Frank Hermantz, won all of its games. Varsity status was not granted, however, and the team parted ways.

In 2005, a group of students created a new NEIU baseball club. The Eagles were made up of 24 current students who competed against other collegiate baseball clubs in the Midwest including programs at Columbia College Chicago, Northwestern University, Roosevelt University, and the University of Wisconsin–Madison.

The university also offers women's volleyball, women's soccer, men's soccer, aikido, Brazilian jiu-jitsu, ice hockey, and women's softball. All intramural sports clubs are created and organized by students with the support of the campus recreation department and registered through IMLeagues.

NEIU offers a course called Judo and Self Defense. In 2019, the Golden Eagles Tomodachi Judo Club was formed by students and a faculty member.

== Student life ==
Student demographics as of fall 2025
| Race and ethnicity | Total |
|---|---|
| Hispanic | 44.1% |
| White | 23.0% |
| Black | 12.3% |
| Asian | 8.2% |
| Unknown | 6.4% |
| Noncitizen | 3.1% |
| Two or more races | 2.5% |
| Native American | 0.2% |
| Native Hawaiian/Pacific Islander | 0.1% |
Economic diversity
| Low-income (Note: The percentage of students who received an income-based federal Pell grant intended for low-income students.) | 53% |
| Affluent (Note: The percentage of students who are a part of the American middle class at the bare minimum.) | 47% |

NEIU is a federally designated Minority-Serving Institution (MSI) and a Hispanic-Serving Institution (HSI).

== Notable faculty ==
- Gwendolyn Brooks
- Sarah Hoagland
- Libby Komaiko
- John R. Powers
- Leo Segedin
- Conrad Worrill

== Notable alumni ==
- Muhammed al-Ahari, Islamic essayist and scholar
- Lorrainne Sade Baskerville, social worker and activist
- Michael Angelo Batio, guitarist
- Maria Antonia Berrios, former member of the Illinois House of Representatives
- Bob Biggins, former member of the Illinois House of Representatives
- Candy Dawson Boyd, writer and activist
- Walter Burnett, Jr., Chicago alderman
- Ana Castillo, writer
- Danny Crawford, professional basketball referee
- John C. D'Amico, member of the Illinois House of Representatives
- Georgiann Davis, sociology professor at the University of Mexico who specialized in intersex topics and the sociology of diagnosis
- Miguel del Valle, former Chicago City Clerk and former Illinois State Senator
- Don Digirolamo, Academy Award-winning re-recording mixer
- Sara Feigenholtz, member of the Illinois House of Representatives
- Jesse Fuentes, Alderperson for Chicago City Council's 26th ward
- Calvin L. Giles, former member of the Illinois House of Representatives
- David George Gordon, naturalist and non-fiction writer
- Luis V. Gutiérrez, first Latino to be elected to Congress from the Midwest
- Alan Hargesheimer, Major League Baseball pitcher
- Robert Jordan, veteran journalist and retired news anchor for WGN-TV in Chicago
- Richard J. Koubek, 11th President of Michigan Technological University
- Margaret Laurino, former Chicago alderman
- Iris Y. Martinez, Illinois State Senator
- Tim McIlrath, singer of Rise Against
- John Pankow, actor
- Art Porter, Jr., saxophonist
- Delia Ramirez, member of the US House of Representatives for Illinois's 3rd congressional district
- Warner Saunders, newscaster, WMAQ-TV in Chicago
- Christopher J. Schneider, award-winning professor at Wilfrid Laurier University
- Ed H. Smith, former Chicago alderman
- Juliana Taimoorazy, Assyrian activist, founder and current president of the Iraqi Christian Relief Council
- Keeanga-Yamahtta Taylor, Princeton University professor of African-American Studies, activist, and 2021 MacArthur "Genius Grant" recipient
- Karen Yarbrough, Cook County Recorder of Deeds, former member of the Illinois House of Representatives
