= Libby Komaiko =

Libby Ann Komaiko (June 30, 1949 – February 2, 2019) was an American classical dancer and educator, whose career spanned 50 years in culturally specific art, dance, and education. She is the founder of the Ensemble Español Spanish Dance Theater in residence at Northeastern Illinois University in Chicago, Illinois.

== Early life ==
Born in Chicago to Dorothy, a concert pianist and educator, and Robert, a music educator who served as the fine arts coordinator at Kaplan Jewish Community Center, Libby Komaiko's passion for dance began at the age of nine after seeing a performance of The Nutcracker. She began her dance training with Elisa Stigler at the Chicago Musical College of Roosevelt University. At 18, after an invitation to audition for a scholarship, Komaiko earned the opportunity to train and perform with the legendary Jose Greco's Spanish Dance Company.

== Career ==
Komaiko put aside her dream of being on Broadway and continued to commit herself to Spanish dance. She studied in Spain and the U.S. with Maria Alba, Nana Lorca, Lola Montes, José Greco, and Edo, as well as her partner for several years, Roberto Lorca. Teaching ballet, modern dance, and creative movement across Chicago, Komaiko became part of the Artists in Residence program at Northeastern Illinois University in 1974. Eventually advancing from instructor to full professorship, Komaiko (B.A. ’78 University Without Walls) founded the Ensemble Español Spanish Dance Theater in residence at Northeastern Illinois University in Chicago in 1975. As a dance professor in the school's department of music and dance, she created, developed, directed, and taught the first complete academic program for classical, folkloric, and flamenco dance and music. In 1983, she was granted the Lazo de Dama de la Orden de Isabel la Católica.

In 1985, committed to bringing this art form and education to a range of students across the city to change lives, Komaiko and Lillian Hemover, executive director of the Frederick Funston School, launched the Ensemble Español's youth company. With a mission to preserve, promote, and present the flamenco, folkloric, classical, and contemporary dance and music traditions of Spain, Ensemble Español grew from seven students to over 40 dancers, singers, and musicians. It presents over one hundred Spanish dance educational programs a year, reaching nearly 20,000 students in arts education programming, and has performed hundreds of concerts worldwide.

Komaiko contributed flamenco, ballet, folkloric, and classical choreography to over 60 of the company's 125 original works and collaborated with founding members of the National Ballet of Spain, Juan Mata and Ana Gonzales, as well as other Spanish dancers Paco Alonso, Manolete, and Juanjo Linares.

Komaiko retired from dancing in 1994. In 2011, she became professor emerita of Northeastern's Department of Music and Dance. Komaiko recorded an in-depth oral history interview with the Chicago Dance History Project in 2015. She died on February 2, 2019, at the age of 69.

== Honors ==
- Lazo de Dama, Order of Isabella the Catholic (1983)
- Ruth Page Award (2003)
- International Latino Cultural Center Lifetime Achievement Award (2004)
- Legacy Award from Audience Architects
- Northeastern Illinois University Distinguished Alumni Award (2016)
