= Timz =

American rapper

- Born: Thomas Hanna; 1985 (age 40–41); San Diego, California, United States
- Origin: San Diego, California, United States
- Genres: Hip hop
- Occupations: Rapper, producer, musician, songwriter
- Years active: 2006–present
- Website: timzonline.com

Thomas Hanna, known by his stage name Timz, is an Iraqi-American rapper of Assyrian descent best known for his song "Iraq". His debut album is entitled Open for Business.

Born in San Diego, California, to Iraqi parents from Baghdad, Iraq, he has gained recognition through the political messages in his music. He has also been featured on Fox News, MTV News, and Al-Jazeera, as well as being nominated for "Best Hip-Hop Album" at the 2006 San Diego Music Awards.

He has recorded a theme song for the San Diego Chargers football team, although the team hasn't accepted it.

His music video "Iraq" won the 2007 Hollywood Film Festival Music Video of the Year. It also won MTVu's "The Freshman" in 2007.

In 2011 released an EP titled Future History. The track "Refugee" was released as a single from the EP. The song features vocals from Majid Kakka.

== In popular culture ==
In 2011, Timz co-operated with DJ Outlaw and many other Arab rappers and performers in a rap song "Arab World Unite" representing his mother country, Iraq, in the project. The track released on 2seas Records features Qusai and Ayzee (Saudi Arabia), Timz (Iraq), Rush (Egypt), Murder Eyez (Syria), Balti (Tunisia), Flipp (Bahrain), Talal (Palestine), Vico (Lebanon). The song was uploaded to YouTube by DJ Outlaw and has over 90,000 views.

== Discography ==
=== Albums ===
- 2006: Open for Business

=== EPs ===
- 2011: Future History EP

== Videography ==
- 2008: "Iraq"
- 2011: "Refugee" (feat. Majid Kakka)

featured in

- 2011: "Arab World Unite"
