= Iraqi Christian Relief Council =

Assyrian humanitarian organization

- Abbreviation: ICRC
- Founded: 2007; 18 years ago
- Legal status: 501(c)(3) nonprofit organization
- Founder and president: Juliana Taimoorazy
- Key people: Rev. David Fischler (board member); Angela Nichitoi (board member); Violet Khamoo (board member); Dr. David Masters (board member); Denise Bubeck (board member); Armand Ciabatteri (advisor); John Stenson (advisor); Joseph Auteri (advisor)
- Revenue: $1,064,001 (2016)
- Website: iraqichristianrelief.org

The Iraqi Christian Relief Council (ICRC) is an Assyrian-based Christian nonprofit organization founded in 2007 by Assyrian activist Juliana Taimoorazy. The ICRC describes its primary purpose as being to advance the humanitarian and political protection of persecuted Assyrian Christians who live in post-war Iraq, whose population has dwindled from 1,500,000 in 2003 to about 150,000 just 17 years later in 2020 due to ongoing persecution and instability in their homeland.

== History and activities ==
=== Founding and early history ===
The Iraqi Christian Relief Council was founded in 2007 by Juliana Taimoorazy. Taimoorazy started the organization in response to ongoing Assyrian persecution in their homeland of Iraq. According to Taimoorazy, the ICRC did not initially receive very much attention from American officials until the 2014 ISIS invasion of the Assyrian homeland. Since then, it has raised awareness through political advocacy, humanitarian support, and hosting public events, such as candlelight vigils.

=== Humanitarian activities ===
The ICRC predominantly provides humanitarian aid to Assyrians in Iraq. The majority of the aid goes through the Assyrian Aid Society and Dominican Sisters of Saint Catherine of Siena in Northern Iraq. The ICRC also provides humanitarian assistance to Assyrian refugees from Iraq in other countries in the Middle East, including Syria, Lebanon, Jordan and Turkey. In the year 2016, the ICRC provided humanitarian aid to 95,000 Assyrian Christians in Iraq.

The ICRC launched Operation Return to Nineveh in 2016. The project has allowed for the rebuilding of community centers, schools, homes, and churches destroyed by ISIS in predominantly Assyrian-Christian areas of Iraq. It has also further encouraged the establishment of Nineveh Plain Province to act as a safe haven for Assyrians in Iraq.

=== Assyrian Political advocacy ===
Taimoorazy has also met with Iraqi parliamentarians on behalf of ICRC to discuss the creation of a Christian province in Iraq.

In August 2019, the ICRC and 15 other Assyrian organizations released a coalition letter thanking Representative Josh Harder for the creation of House Resolution 537, which would have the United States officially recognize the Assyrian genocide if passed.

On behalf of the ICRC's leadership, Taimoorazy criticized the Kurdistan Regional Government (KRG) independence referendum for its potential negative impact on the Assyrian population of the region, and criticized the threats of violence issued by the KRG against Assyrians who protested the referendum.

The ICRC released an official statement in 2020 condemning the refusal of the government of Turkey to investigate the disappearance of Assyrian couple Hurmiz and Shimoni Diril.

=== COVID-19 response ===
In 2020, the ICRC started the Save Those Who Save Lives Campaign. The campaign pledged $5,000 on behalf of ICRC to provide masks to healthcare workers in the United States as a response to the COVID-19 pandemic.

The ICRC also joined 27 other Non-governmental organizations and signed a letter calling on Iraqi authorities and the United Nations to implement measures aimed at preventing a humanitarian and security catastrophe in Sinjar, Tel Afar, and the Nineveh Plain as a result of the COVID-19 pandemic.
