= Populism in Canada =

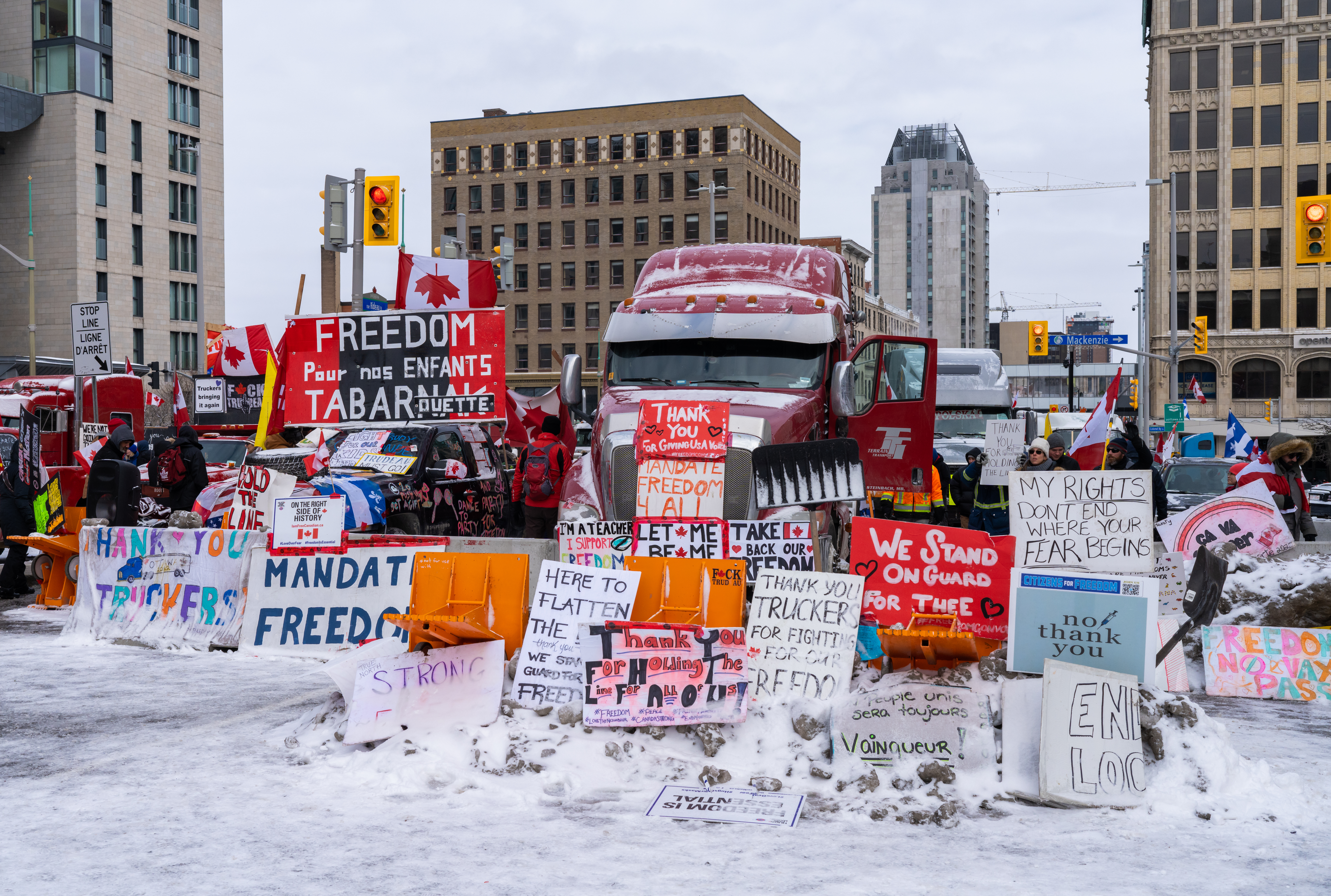
The Canada convoy protest in 2022 was described an expression of right-wing populism within Canada.

Populism has been part of Canada's political culture through its history and across the political spectrum. Populist parties and movements have included the Canadian social credit movement which achieved electoral strengths in Western Canada and to some extent in Quebec in the early to mid 20th century, and the Reform Party of Canada which became the largest conservative party in Parliament from a base in Western Canada in the 1990s.

According to Laycock, Quebecois populism is largely intertwined in Quebec nationalism and thus has to be examined with its own ideological and linguistic dynamics taken into consideration.

== Overview ==
In his 1981 Studies in Political Economy journal article, "Populism: A qualified defence", John Richards, a public policy professor at Simon Fraser University, said that there were elements of populism in the Liberal Party under Mackenzie (leader from 1873 to 1880) and Laurier (leader from 1887 to 1919); Pattulo's British Columbia Liberal Party during the 1930s; Liberal Party of Ontario under Mitchell Hepburn (leader from 1930 to 1942); the many socialist and labour parties leading up to the 1932 founding of the CCF; the Manitoba Liberal-Progressive Party; the Union Nationale in Quebec under Maurice Duplessis (leader from 1935 to 1959); the early Diefenbaker Tory party; the federal NDP under Tommy Douglas (leader from 1961 to 1971); and, to some extent, the Liberal Party of P. E. Trudeau (leader from 1968 to 1984). Richards identified four "types of populist experience"—agrarian protest populist movements in the United States and Canada; the 19th century traditional, communal values, peasant populism admired by Russian intellectuals; authoritarian populism of regimes such Peronism in Argentina; and contemporary populism adopted by political leaders and parties to appeal to the "shared interests of the people" in contrast to those of the "powerfully organized 'vested interests' and traditional 'old-line' politicians." Richards traced a shift in the populist movement to the mid-1980s. He said that left-wing activists in North America shifted away from New Left politics in the 1970s. In Canada, some became active in unions, the New Democrat Party, and the Parti Québécois. The 1986 book Citizen Action said that in the 1960s and 1970s in the United States, American conservatism became "imbued with right-wing populism".

Populism in Canada has always had a very regional character to it. Populist politics in Western Canada has been fueled by perceived mistreatment by the federal government. For instance, Lawson cites divergent opinions on economic and cultural policy as the historical source of alienation and anti-establishment tendencies among Western Canadian politicians and activists. For most of the 20th Century, the federal government of Canada was controlled by the Liberal Party of Canada which historically found its support primarily within Ontario and Quebec. The Liberal Party's base of support in central Canada has led it to pursue economic policies that diverged from the goals of western provinces. Examples of federal economic policies that did not align with Western goals include high tariffs in the early 20th century, National Energy Program of 1980, the Equalization Program, and the pipeline politics of the 21st century.

== 19th century ==
Anti-establishment populist politics became an important political force in 19th century Ontario amongst rural and working class political activists who were influenced by American populist radicals. Populism also became an important political force in Western Canada by the 1880s and 1890s. Populism was particularly strong in the form of farmer-labour coalition politics in the late 19th century.

== 20th century ==
Multiple important populist political movements were formed throughout Canada in the 20th century. Western Canada and the Canadian Prairies in particular were the birthplace of a number of Canada's populist movements in the 20th century. Quebec would also see its fair share of populists movements especially at a provincial level.

=== United Farmers movement ===
In 1921, both Liberals and Conservatives lost to the United Farmers of Alberta (UFA) in the 1921 provincial election. The United Farmers of Alberta (UFA) and United Farmers of Saskatchewan (UFS) were formed by Prairie farmers that rejected party-dominated parliamentary representation advocated a quasi-syndicalist system of functional representation in a delegate democracy. This movement was motivated by federally imposed tariffs and freight rates which put pressure on farmers in the prairies. The UFA governed the province of Alberta from 1921 to 1935.

=== Union Nationale ===
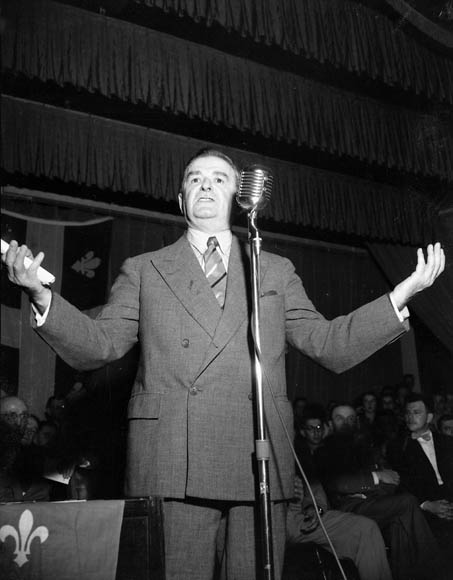
Maurice Duplessis is widely considered to have been a leading figure of the right-populist movement in Quebec in 1930s and 1940s

Union Nationale was founded in the aftermath of the 1935 Quebec general election, when the newly founded Action libérale nationale under former Quebec liberal Paul Gouin and Conservative Party of Quebec under Maurice Duplessis failed to diminish the majority government of the Liberal Party of Quebec under Louis-Alexandre Taschereau. Gouin and Duplessis formally merged their parties on 20 June 1936 to form Union Nationale (national union) with Duplessis as their leader. Duplessis built Union Nationale as a nationalist, right-wing populist party with stanch opposition to communism and strict adherence to Clerico-nationalism, economic liberalism and Quebec nationalism.

Under Duplessis' leadership Union Nationale won their first term in 1936 after Taschereau resigned in scandal and was replaced by Adélard Godbout. Despite losing in a rematch to Godbout's Quebec Liberal Party in 1939, Duplessis would go on to regain a full majority from Godbout in 1944 and continue to serve his second run a premier of Quebec until he died in office on September 7, 1959. Union Nationale would be defeated in the subsequent the 1960 Quebec general election which saw the liberals regain power under Jean Lesage and bring the Quiet Revolution into full swing. Despite regaining a majority in the 1966 Quebec general election under Daniel Johnson Sr., the quickly-changing Quebec under the Quiet Revolution soon saw the decline of Union Nationale; the party lost the 1970 Quebec general election after Johnson died of a heart attack in office. Union Nationale would continue their electoral decline and formally dissolved on 19 June 1989.

=== Social Credit (Socred) ===
The Social Credit populist political parties won provincial elections in two provinces—the 1935 Alberta general election under William Aberhart and the 1952 British Columbia general election under W.A.C. Bennett.. At the federal level Social Credit and its breakaway Quebec wing (Ralliement des créditistes du Canada) were represented in Parliament until 1980.

In 1933, William Aberhart, also known as Bible Bill, formed the Social Credit Party of Alberta (nicknamed the Socreds). Social Credit governed the province continuously from 1935 until the 1971 election, when the party lost to Peter Lougheed's Progressive Conservatives. The party initially promoted the principles of social credit economics alongside a right-wing populist agenda and the party governed Alberta from 1935 to 1971. By the late 1930s with social credit financial reforms being unable to be carried out at the provincial level, Aberhart refocused the Alberta Social Credit party to attacking social welfare programs and state socialism. Ernest Manning took over the Alberta Social Credit party and office of Premier of Alberta from Aberhart and led the Alberta Social Credit party along a right-wing populist agenda that criticized both the social welfare programs and centralizing tendencies of the federal government of Canada.

=== Co-operative Commonwealth Federation (CCF) ===
In 1932, in response to the hardships of the Great Depression, a coalition of labour, socialists, and progressives in Calgary, Alberta founded the Co-operative Commonwealth Federation (CCF). Tommy Douglas, who became a social activist at the onset of the Depression, joined the new CCF and was elected as MP in the 1935 federal election.

In his 1978 Canadian Journal of Political Science journal article, "Populism in the United States, Russia, and Canada: Explaining the Roots of Canada's Third Parties", John Conway said that CCF and Alberta's Social Credit were, to some extent, "populist formations." Conway said that the CCF is an example of a populist party that transitioned successfully into a democratic party—the New Democratic Party. He said that the NDP, which was formed in 1961, was modelled on European social democratic parties and Britain's and Australia's Labour parties.

In 1961, the CCF was succeeded by the New Democratic Party (NDP).

=== Ralliement créditiste ===
Ralliement créditiste was a series of Quebec-based Social Credit parties both provincial and federal. First founded under the name Union des électeurs by Louis Even and Gilberte Côté-Mercier, the party failed to secure any seats federally or provincially in any formal election. Réal Caouette managed to secure a seat for the party in the house of commons in a 1946 by-election but lost the seat in the 1949 Canadian federal election. Caouette would eventually leave the party to found Ralliement des créditistes du Canada to serve as the Quebec branch of the Social Credit Party of Canada which went on to win 26 seats for the party in the 1962 Canadian federal election and 20 seats the following year. Having lost a leadership bid for the Social Credit Party of Canada to Robert N. Thompson in 1961 and growing increasingly disenfranchised by the party's move away from social credit theory under the influence of Ernest Manning, Caouette lead the Ralliement des créditistes to split from the social credit party and stand as their own federal party in 1963. The parties would remain split until their unification at the 1971 Social Credit convention in which Caouette would be elected leader of the newly united Social Credit Party of Canada. Caouette's politics were described as a combination of Quebec nationalism, social conservatism and social credit monetary theory.

In the time during the split, a provincial branch of the Ralliement créditiste was founded under the name Ralliement créditiste du Québec with Camil Samson as their leader. Much like its federal counterpart, the party was a conservative populist party that looked to implement social credit theory at a provincial level. Despite initial success during the 1970 Quebec general election which saw a 12-seat gain and a siphoning of support from declining Union Nationale (including the defection of MLA Gaston Tremblay), Ralliement créditiste du Québec was unable to replicate the same success in subsequent elections and dissolved on November 12, 1978. Preston Manning would cite Ralliement créditiste du Québec as an example of a populist third party in his 1992 book The New Canada.

=== Reform Party of Canada ===
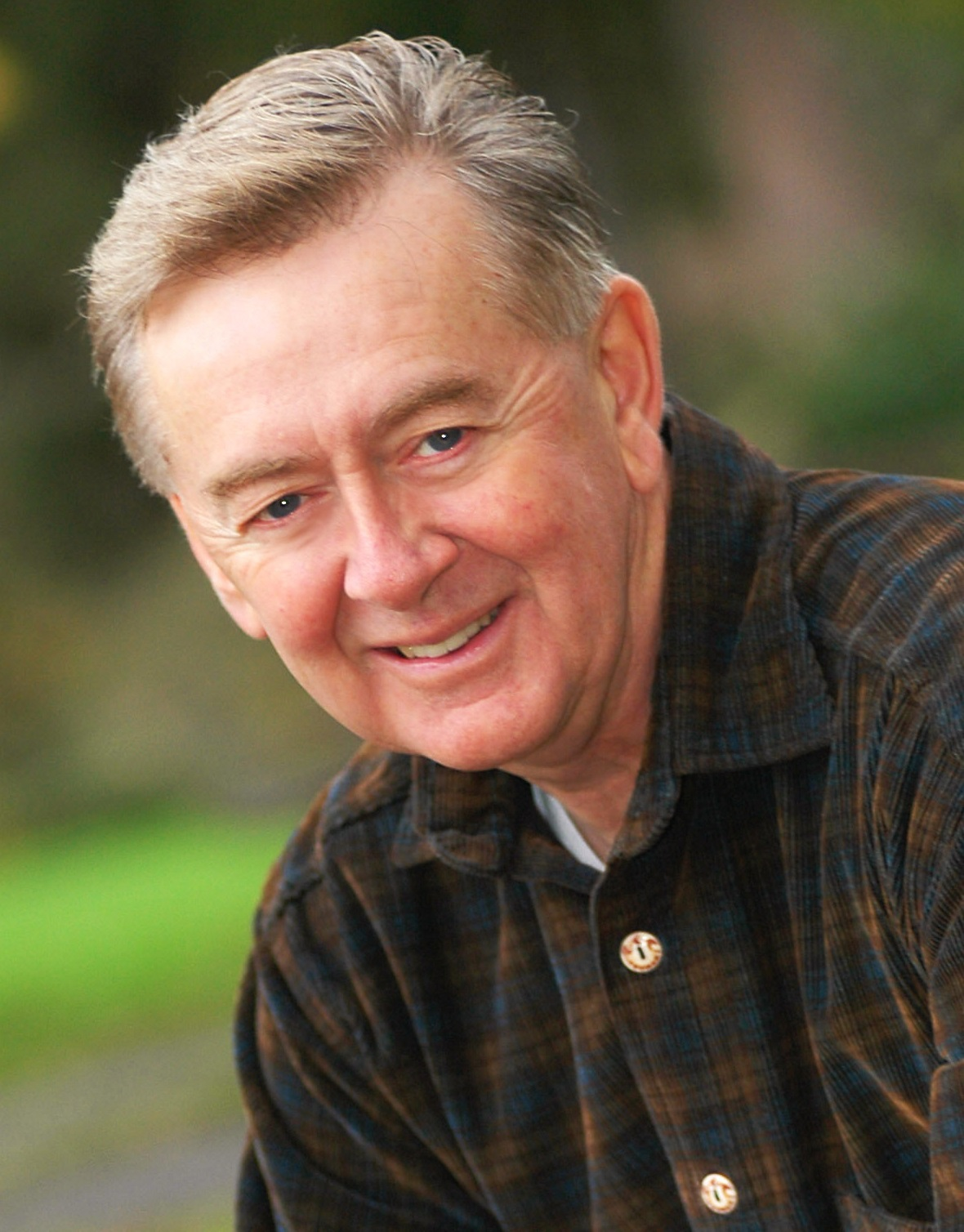
Preston Manning led the populist-conservative movement in the 1990s. This campaigns were fueled primarily by Western alienation.

The Reform Party of Canada was a right-wing populist party that existed from 1987 to 2000. It was formed and led by Preston Manning, the son of former Social Credit Alberta Premier Ernest Manning. It was originally a Western Canadian protest party that captured the support of right-wing Western Canadians who were disillusioned with the federal Progressive Conservative Party of Canada and in particular its preference for resolving the grievances of Quebec over the West. It also drew support of right-wing conservative Canadians who were dismayed by the Progressive Conservatives' inability to deliver their promised tax cuts and spending cuts. In 1993, the Reform Party made a political breakthrough in electing large numbers of members of parliament.

The Reform Party opposed LGBT rights, and advocated for more restrictions on immigration.

In 2000, the party re-branded as the Canadian Alliance Party before merged with the Progressive Conservative Party in 2003 to form the modern-day Conservative Party of Canada.

=== Action démocratique du Québec ===
The Action démocratique du Québec was a political party in Quebec. It was a splinter group from the Quebec Liberal Party that espoused right-wing populist policy positions. It merged into Coalition Avenir Québec in 2012.

== 21st century ==
Canada followed global trends in the 21st Century with the rise of right-wing populism within all levels of government. The rise of right-wing populism in Canada can interpreted as a backlash to high immigration, cultural diversity, economic challenges, and government responses to the COVID-19 pandemic.

=== Canada Convoy Protests ===
On January 22, 2022, a group of truck drivers drove from Prince Rupert, BC across Canada to Ottawa to protest the public health measures implemented by the Trudeau government during the COVID-19 pandemic. Canada Unity was responsible for organizing the movement. This protest became known as the Canada convoy protest or Convoi de la liberté in French. In particular, the protest was targeted against vaccine mandates. This movement started as a protest movement against public health measures but became a protest against Justin Trudeau's governance of Canada. Elements of the Conservative Party of Canada, including its newly elected leader Pierre Poilievre supported the Canada Convoy Protests in Ottawa. The protest's general anti-establishment nature has led it to be characterized as a part of the rising right-wing populist movement spreading across the Western world.

=== Ford Nation ===
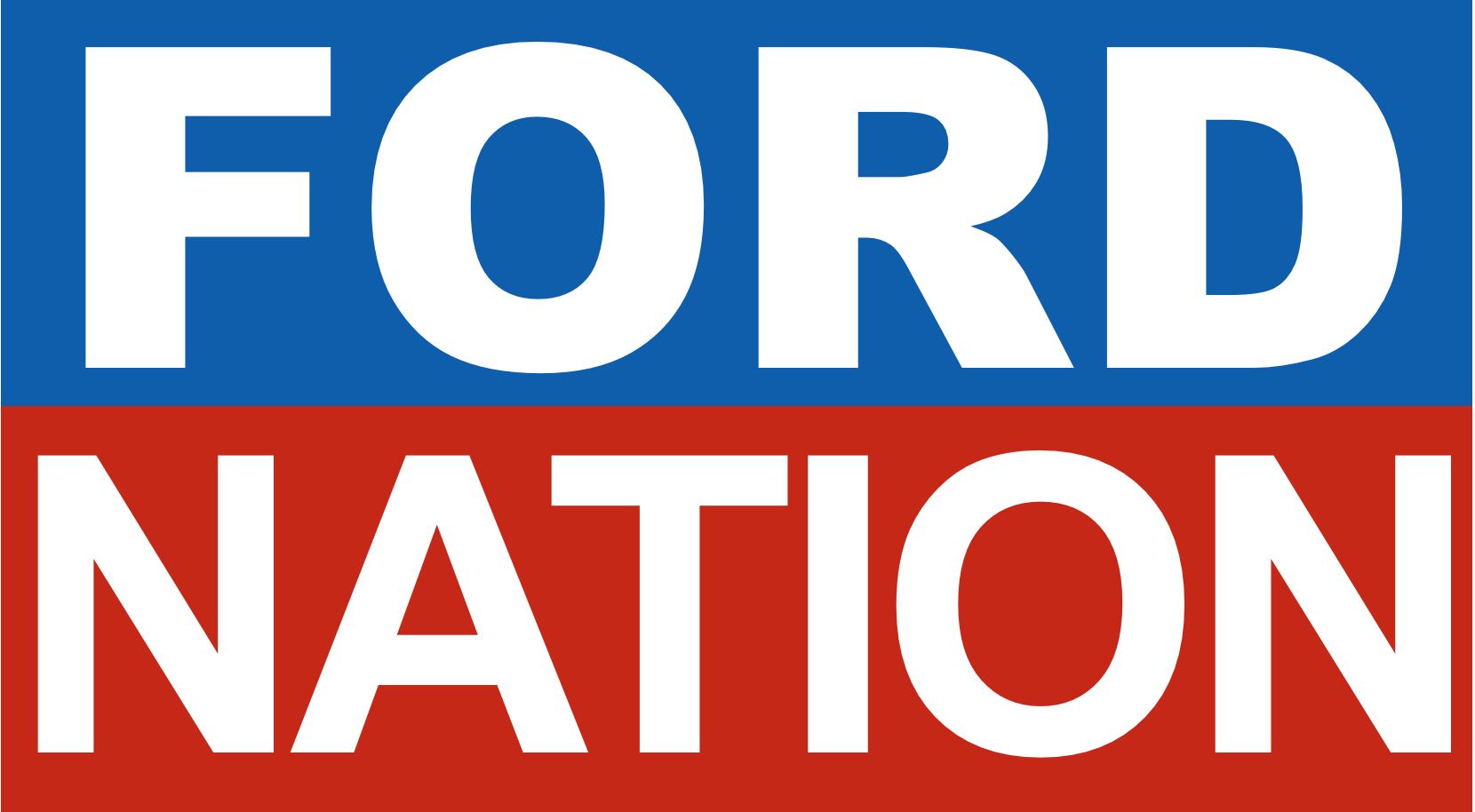
The official "Ford Nation" party flag

Under the leadership of Doug Ford, the Progressive Conservative Party of Ontario has been described as having right-wing populist attributes. The "Ford Nation" is a political movement centred on the Ford political family that advocates for suburban-focused and neoliberal populism. The Ford family originates from Etobicoke. The Ford Nation movement reached its initial success with the election of Rob Ford in the 2010 Toronto mayoral election. Following Rob Ford's decision to not run in 2014 Toronto mayoral election, his brother Doug Ford, who was a Toronto city councillor at the time, choose to run in his place. Although he lost, Doug Ford ran in the 2018 Progressive Conservative Party of Ontario leadership election as a populist candidate and won. He went on to win the 2018 Ontario general election. The Ford Nation movement is noted for its opposition to institutionalism and anti-establishment politics. Despite being a right-wing populist movement, the Ford Nation movement has drawn support from immigrant communities within Toronto and the broader GTA.

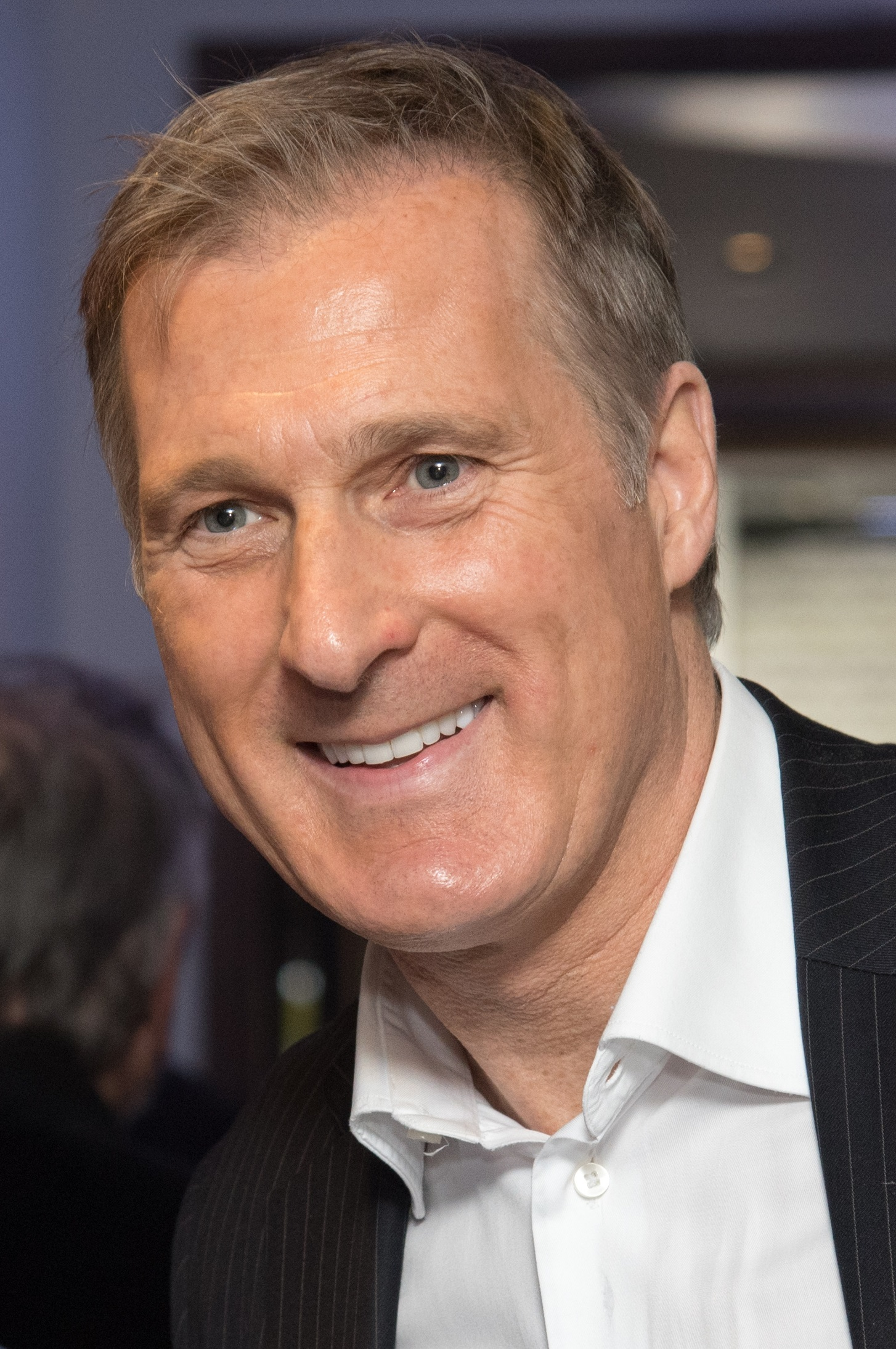
Maxime Bernier in 2017

=== People's Party of Canada ===
The People's Party of Canada has self-described as populist, and been described as populist by many journalists. Its leader, Maxime Bernier, refers to it as "smart populism", which is based on principles of freedom, responsibility, fairness, and respect, that speak for "all Canadians" and which do not appease special interest groups.

=== Conservative Party of Canada ===
Pierre Poilievre, who has been described as populist by some journalists, won the 2022 Conservative Party of Canada leadership election and became the leader of both the Conservative Party and the Official Opposition. Some journalists have compared Poilievre to American Republican populists such as Ted Cruz, while other journalists have dismissed these comparisons due to Poilievre's pro-choice, and pro-immigration positions, along with support for same-sex marriage.

=== People's Alliance of New Brunswick ===
Some journalists considered the People's Alliance of New Brunswick (PANB) to be a right-wing populist party. The party is served anglophone interests within New Brunswick and was critical of bilingualist policies within the province. The party dissolved on June 30, 2025, due to poor electoral performance.

=== Coalition Avenir Québec ===
The Coalition Avenir Québec is successor of Action démocratique du Québec. The party has been labeled as a right-populist party by some scholars. The CAQ often takes nativist and nationalist positions although they not a separatist party like the Parti Québécois. The party also generally has followed a pragmatist and popular economic agenda, such as rolling back austerity and cutting taxes.

=== Conservative Party of British Columbia ===
Since the ascension of John Rustad as the leader of the Conservative Party of British Columbia, the BC conservatives have been described as populist by some journalists. Rustad resigned on December 4, 2025, leaving the ideological direction of the party uncertain.

== Left-wing populism in Canada ==
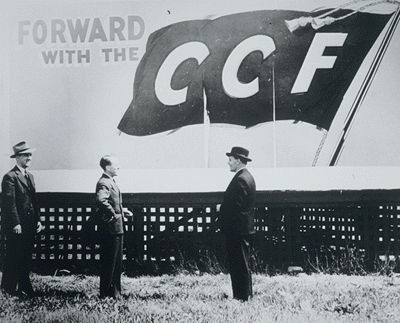

Left-wing populism initially gained traction through farmers' movements and labour activists, who established co-operatives to limit harmful effects of big business. The CCF (1932-1961) was a dominant force regarding populist left ideology.

== See also ==
- Far-right politics in Canada
- Socialism in Canada
