= COVID-19 vaccine card =

Medical record for COVID-19 vaccination

A COVID-19 vaccine card is a record often given to those who have received a COVID-19 vaccine showing information such as the date(s) one has received the shot(s) and the brand of vaccine one has received, sometimes including the lot number. The card also contains information identifying the recipient and the location where the shot was given. Depending on the country, it could serve as an official document verifying one has received vaccination, which could be required by some institutions, such as a school or workplace, when boarding a cruise ship, or when crossing an international border, as proof that one has been vaccinated.

Some countries issue digital records while others issue paper records. In some European Union member states, citizens might choose to have a digital record, a piece of paper, or both.

== By country ==
=== Australia ===
In Australia, vaccine providers are required to report to the Australian Immunisation Register no later than 10 days after a vaccination is given. People who have been vaccinated can either access a digital record of vaccination on a smartphone, or request a paper copy of their vaccination record.

=== Austria ===
In October 2021, Austria has emitted 43.058.575 out of 591.728.344 EU Digital COVID Certificate emitted within the EEA.

=== Brazil ===
In December 2020, the Brazilian senate approved digital cards.

=== Canada ===
Sample Canadian vaccination certificate issued by the government of Yukon.

In Canada, vaccination certificates are issued by the health authorities of each province and territory. Vaccine certificate/passport systems were introduced in the provinces of British Columbia, Manitoba, and Quebec starting in September 2021.

Since October 2021, all vaccination certificates follow a single national design standard, and include a QR Code for validation in accordance with the international SMART Health Card framework.

=== China ===
China uses digital vaccine certificates for cross border travel. Launched in March 2021, the system uses QR codes that show the individual's vaccination status as well as RT-PCR test and Rapid antigen test results and is built atop Tencent's WeChat platform. Prior to this, QR health codes were required for public transport and access to public spaces in the country. The platform also allows for digital contact tracing and shows a green code for users who have not been in contact with infected people. The system has sparked concerns over government surveillance and privacy of users.

=== Egypt ===
Those who have received two doses of a vaccine receive a certificate that allows them to travel. Vaccinated users can either receive a vaccine card or register online after receiving both doses to get a certificate. In October 2021, the government announced the launch of a mobile app that would enable the verification of an individual's vaccination status using a QR code instead of carrying a certificate.

=== France ===
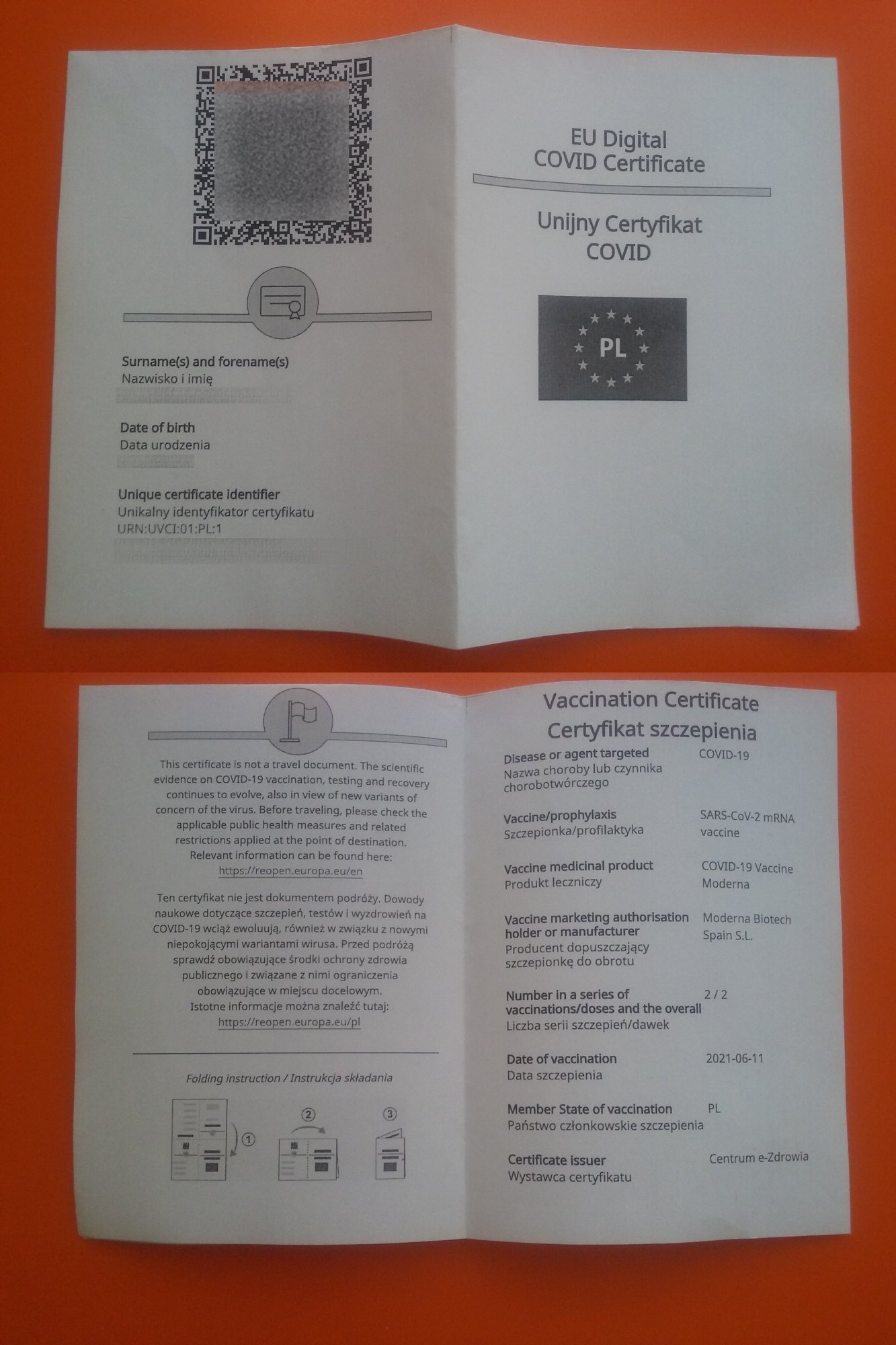
EU Digital COVID Certificate (COVID-19 passport) downloaded from Polish governmental website

Vaccine certificates in France are issued with a QR code — an EU Digital COVID Certificate — scanned onto the country's contact tracing app, TousAntiCovid. The app, which can also scan the QR Code of a test result, allows those vaccinated to show their vaccination status on their smartphone.

In October 2021, France has emitted 136.901.354 out of 591.728.344 EU Digital COVID Certificate emitted within the EEA.

For vaccine certificates, there are 72 186 091 French vaccine certificate for 437 509 564 EU ones (that is 16%).

=== Germany ===
In Germany, vaccination is documented in the International Certificate of Vaccination or Prophylaxis, commonly known as "gelber Impfpass" (yellow vaccination passport) The EU Digital COVID Certificate is also available, and officially recognized. It is regularly issued since July 1, 2021 in vaccination centers for people receiving their vaccination and in pharmacies for those who were vaccinated before July.

In October 2021, Germany has emitted 123.254.466 out of 591.728.344 EU Digital COVID Certificate emitted within the EEA.

For vaccine certificates, there are 119.750.418 German vaccine certificates for 437 509 564 EU ones (that is 27%).

=== India ===
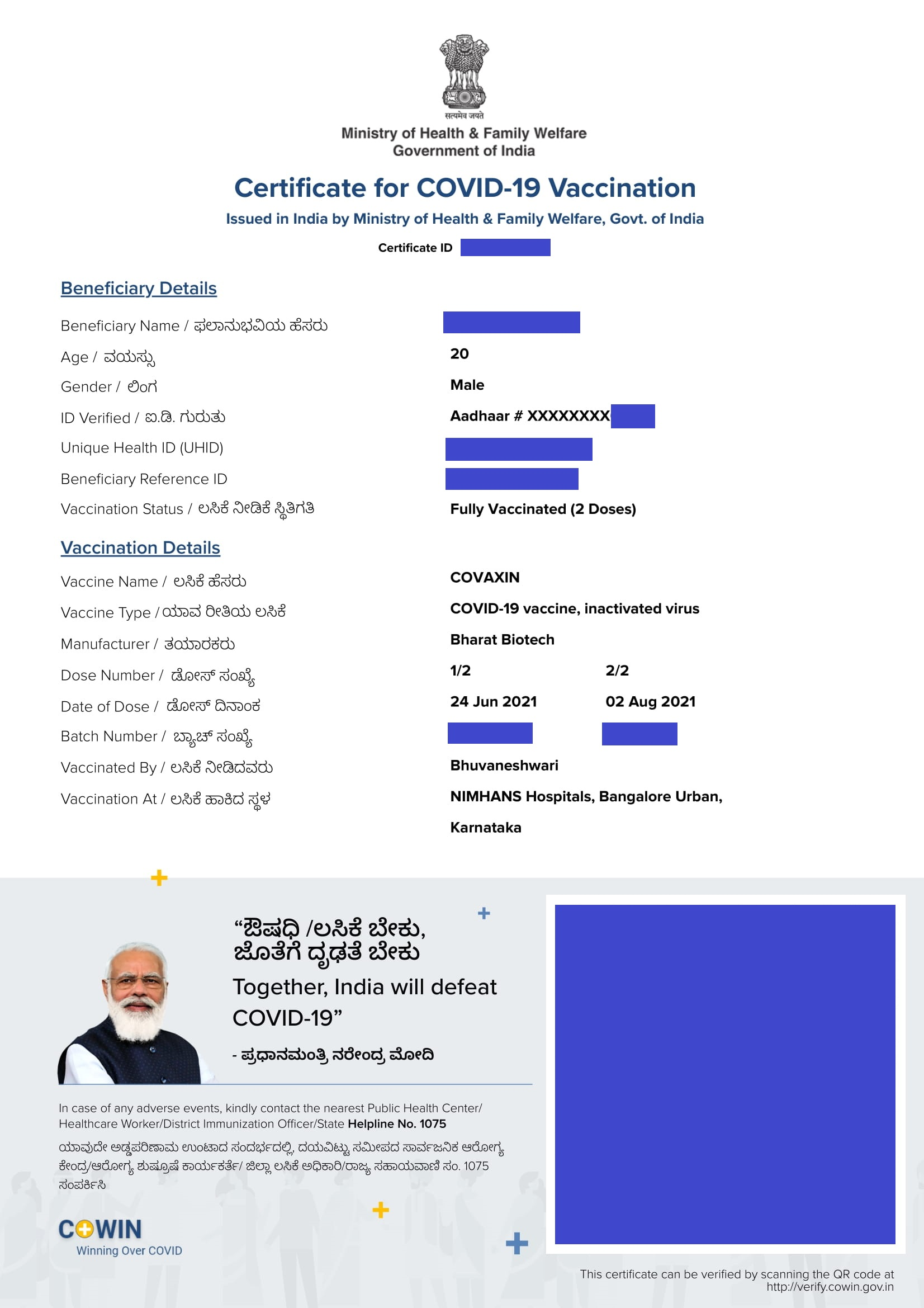
Indian CoVID-19 vaccination certificate from the state of Karnataka showing completion of 2 doses. Information is provided in English (One of the two central government's official language) and Kannada (State of Karnataka's official language).

In India, once a person receives a dose of vaccine, a digital certificate is issued that can either be downloaded from the CoWIN web portal, from the UMANG mobile app, from the Aarogya Setu mobile app or it can directly be downloaded on to citizen's digital document wallet Digilocker. A provisional certificate is issued after the first dose, which contains the vaccinated person's personal details, the vaccine used, the vaccinator's name, and the window for the next dose. A final certificate is issued after the second dose. For those traveling abroad, an option to link their passport is available.

=== Iran ===
Iran made issuing digital vaccine card mandatory for full vaccine administration.

=== Indonesia ===
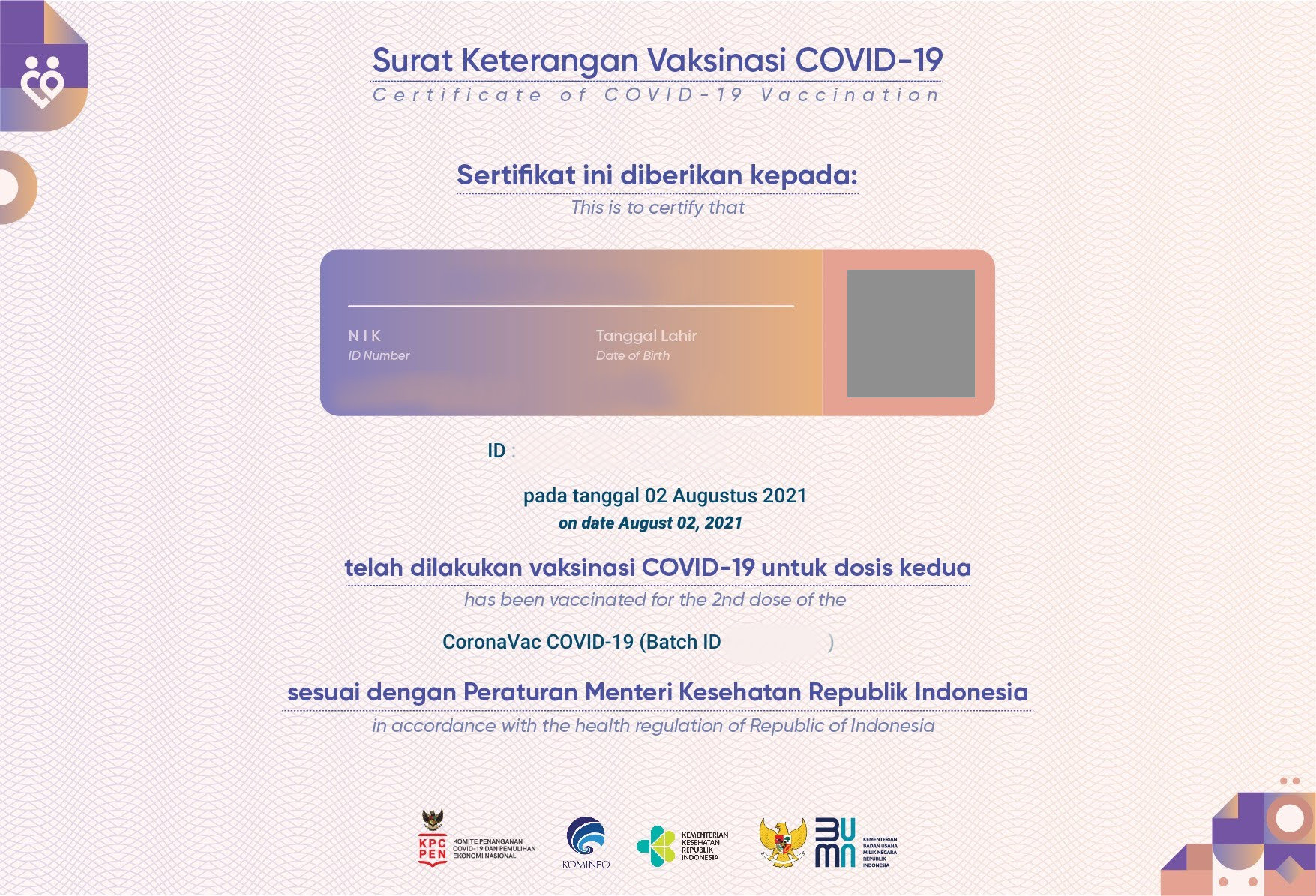
COVID-19 vaccination certificate issued by the Indonesian government for the second dose vaccination.

In Indonesia, every person who have received at least a dose of vaccine will receive a vaccine card and vaccination certificate which can be downloaded from PeduliLindungi mobile app. Vaccination card contains the vaccinated person's personal details, the vaccine used, the vaccinator's name, the batch number of the vaccine used, and the window for the next dose.

=== Ireland ===
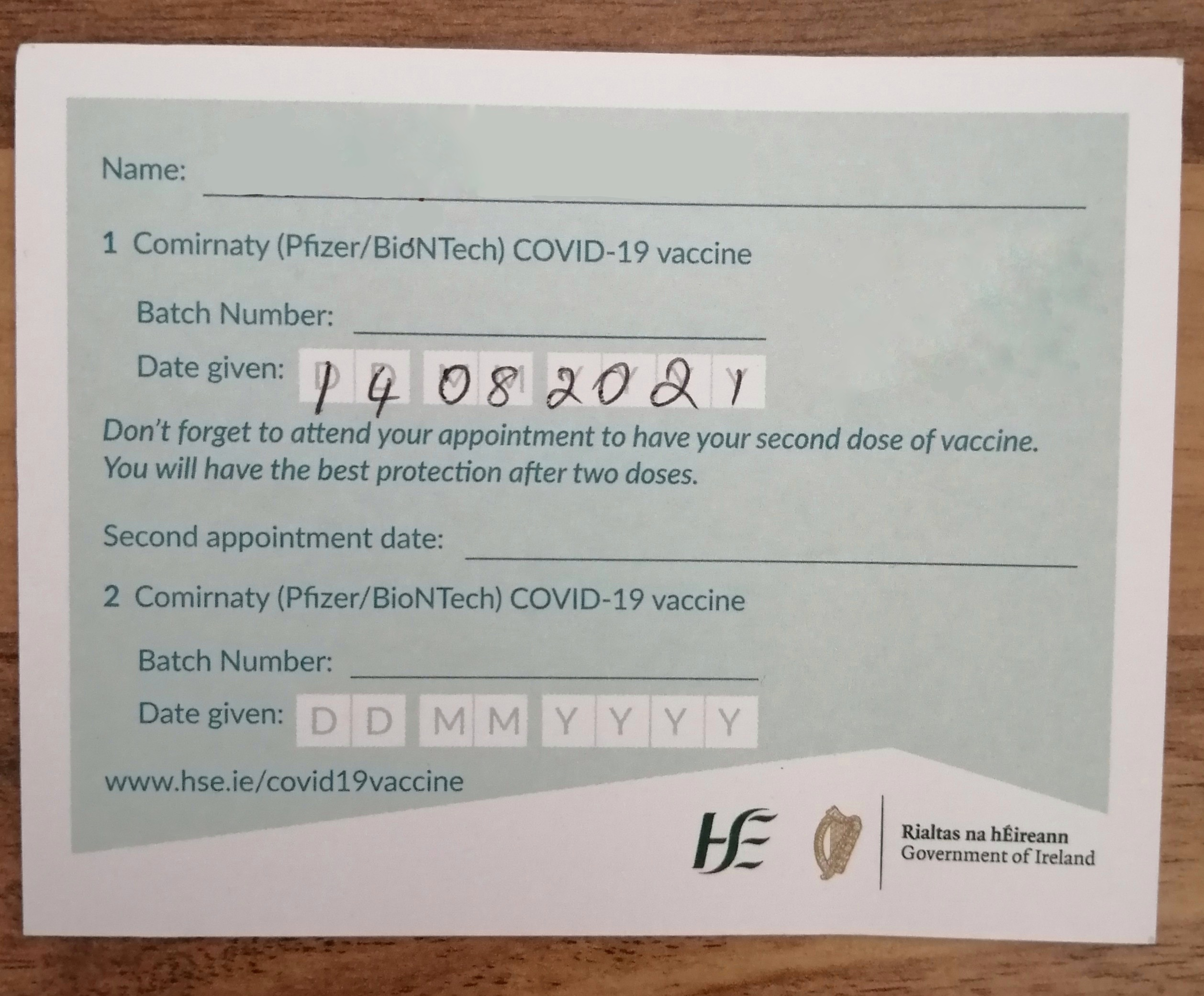
A COVID-19 Vaccination Record Card issued by the Health Service Executive (HSE) in Ireland

On 12 July 2021, fully vaccinated people in Ireland began receiving their EU Digital COVID Certificates via email or post. The EU Digital COVID Certificate in Ireland was initially used for international travel as restrictions into and out of the country eased from 19 July, but was also used in restaurants, hotels and bars as proof of vaccination to gain access to indoor hospitality, as well as in nightclubs, indoor live entertainment, cinemas, theatres and gyms. Requirements on the use of vaccine certificates domestically were scrapped in January 2022.

The Health Service Executive (HSE) issues a vaccine record card to those receiving a COVID-19 vaccine in Ireland that provides reminders for a follow-up appointment. The card contains the recipient's name, the dates on which the two doses were administered, the name of the vaccine, and its batch number. The vaccine record card could also be used as proof of vaccination.

=== Israel ===
In February 2021, Israel rolled out its Green Pass system for those who had completed a week after taking their second dose of the vaccine or those who had recovered from the virus and were ineligible to take the vaccine. The Green Pass is issued by the Ministry of Health. It is a secure digital certificate that is required to enter certain crowded areas such as restaurants, gyms, theatres, and synagogues that have registered themselves as part of the system. A vaccinated person has to either download the app or use the website to download the certificate. A QR Code is provided to allow the pass to be verified. When launched, the pass was valid for six months from the date of the second dose of the vaccine. In May, the Ministry extended the validity of the Green Pass until the end of the year.

=== Italy ===
Italy uses the EU Digital COVID Certificate, which is also referred to as the Green Pass.

In October 2021, Italy has emitted 97.058.162 out of 591.728.344 EU Digital COVID Certificate emitted within the EEA.

=== New Zealand ===
Under the New Zealand Government's COVID-19 Protection Framework, a vaccine pass may be required for access to some non-essential venues such as restaurants, sports centres, and faith-based gatherings. The pass contains an individual's name, date of birth, and a QR code. Some venues may choose to check the name on the pass with the individual's photo ID, but this is not required by law.

=== Philippines ===
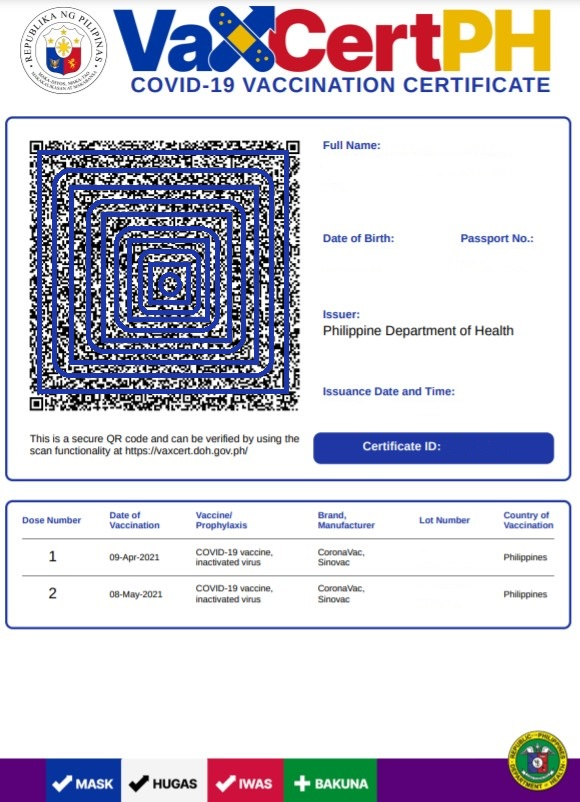
Digital VaxCertPH document issued in the Philippines.

Upon being vaccinated with a COVID-19 vaccine, the local government unit (LGU) or recognized private healthcare providers issue a vaccine card that shall act as proof of vaccination. The Department of Information and Communications Technology (DICT) is presently working with the Inter-Agency Task Force for the Management of Emerging Infectious Diseases (IATF-EID) for a centralized registry for COVID-19 vaccinated residents under a common digital vaccine ID that shall feature a unique QR code and a person's photograph.

Since 2021, the Bureau of Quarantine of the Philippines has updated the existing International Certificate of Vaccination (ICV) that shall include information for being vaccinated from COVID-19 and currently being issued to Overseas Filipino Workers (OFW) and residents going on international travel. The new ICV contains a unique QR code, which allows the verification of the authenticity of the said certificate. At presently, the ICV can only be issued to Filipino citizens and residents who have been vaccinated with a COVID-19 vaccine listed under the Emergency Use Listing (EUL) by the World Health Organization (WHO).

=== South Africa ===
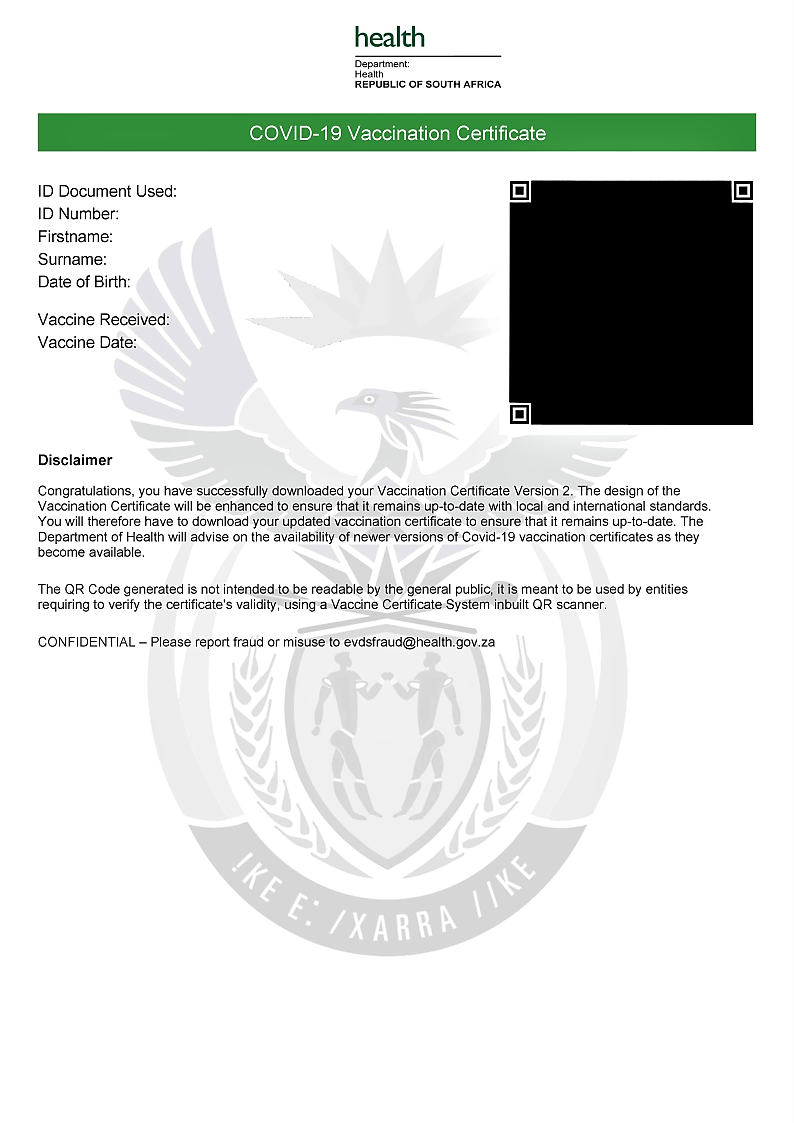
Digital Vaccine Card Used in South Africa (Version 2)

Current South African COVID-19 Vaccination Record Cards Contain Identification information and provision for 3 doses of vaccines.

The eVaccine Card or Digital Vaccine Certificates can be assessed at https://vaccine.certificate.health.gov.za/

The Digital Certificate has the Department of Health Logo at the top with a QR Code on the right intended to be used in the future, said to be available by the end of 2021.

There 3 sections to the Certificate.

The first section contains identification data including ID Document Used, ID Number, First Name, Surname and Date Of Birth.

The second section contains vaccine dose information as in Vaccine Received, Vaccine Date and Proof of vaccination code. This will be on there twice if the individual has received more than one dose.

The final section contains a card expiration date.

=== Singapore ===
After receiving each vaccination dose, an individual will be provided a physical vaccination card that certifies an individual's vaccination status. This information is also recorded on the National Immunisation Registry and is viewable through the Ministry of Health's HealthHub application. The ability to verify one's vaccination status was also added to the TraceTogether application in version 2.11. TraceTogether is used to verify one's vaccination status when entering businesses, and for contact tracing purposes. From 26 April 2022 onwards, there is no need to verify one's vaccination status using the TraceTogether application when entering businesses, unless at large events or at certain nightlife establishments.

Outbound travellers who have been fully vaccinated in Singapore can also obtain a Vaccination HealthCert, which is a digitally verifiable proof of vaccination. When required, foreign authorities can use the QR codes in the Vaccination HealthCert to verify that it has not been tampered with.

=== Sweden ===
As of the 24th of August, the Swedish government have discussed implementing a vaccine card, restricting access to music and culture events to people with two vaccine doses.

=== Switzerland ===
Digital and hard copy versions of COVID-19 vaccine cards are issued by the respective cantons upon full vaccination. The federal government provides an app and registration site, as well as QR coded documents for immunised Swiss residents. Such certification is valid for 365 days and must be provided upon entering certain premises and/or for international travel. So far, Switzerland has fully adhered to EU protocols, and digital EU vaccine certificates are approved in Switzerland, as are some of the Asian vaccines for certain travelers.

=== Taiwan ===
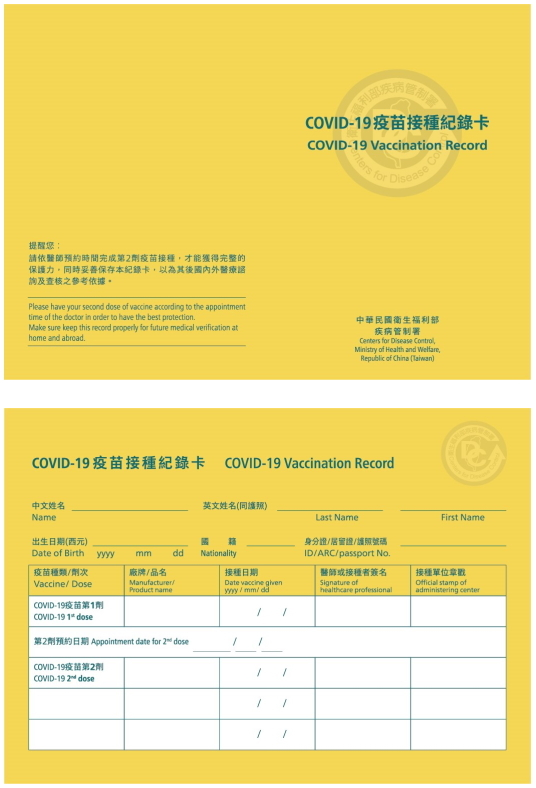
A COVID-19 Vaccination Record card issued in the Republic of China (Taiwan)

After inoculation, individuals receive an official yellow card like the one above that records individuals' vaccination information.

=== United Kingdom ===
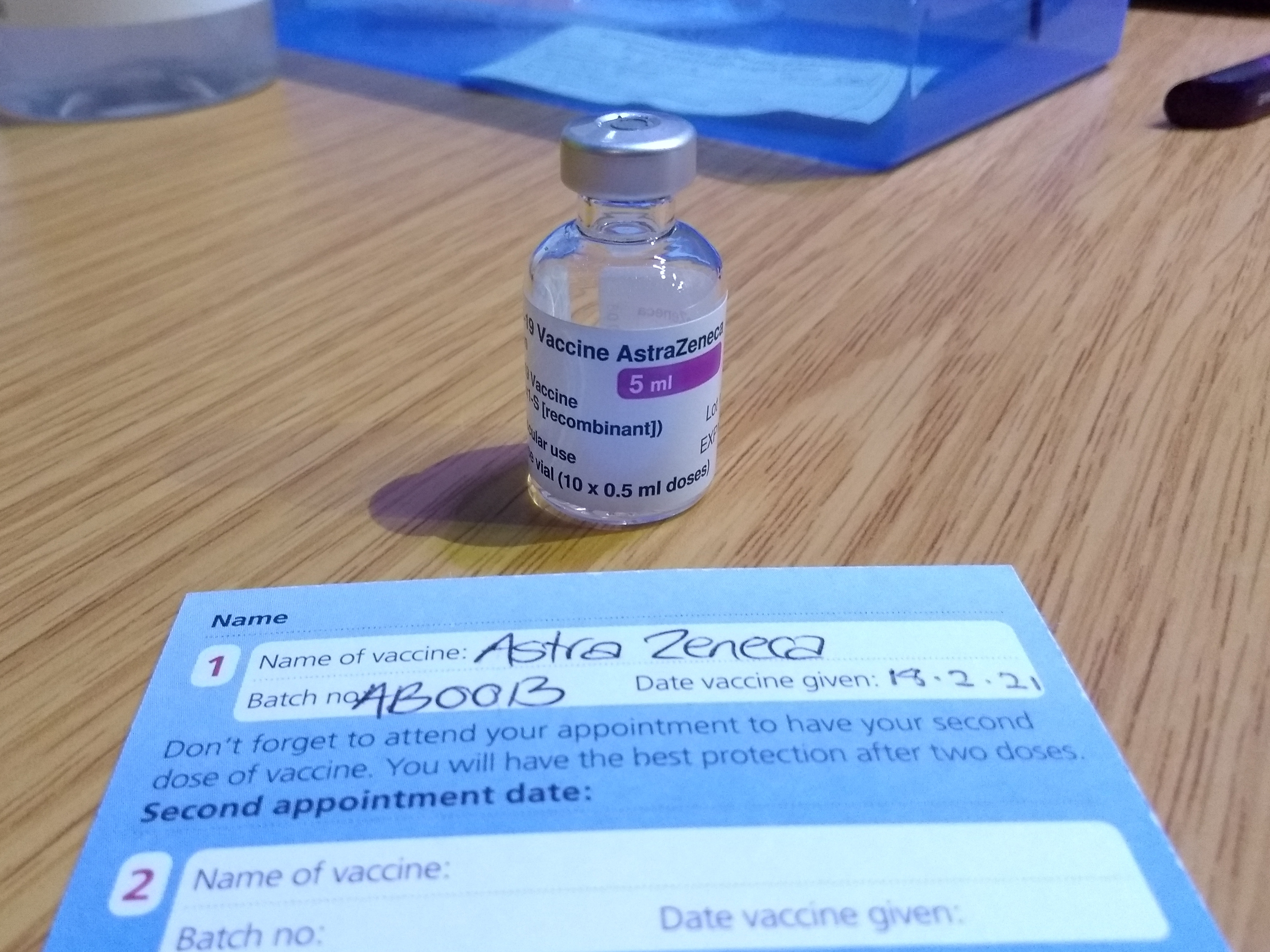
A vaccine card issued in the United Kingdom.

Those receiving a COVID-19 vaccine in the United Kingdom (except Scotland) are given a card the size of a credit card that provides reminders for a follow-up appointment. The card contains the recipient's name, the dates on which the two doses were administered, the name of the vaccine, and its batch number. Vaccinated people looking to travel abroad can take a printout of their certificate from the website of the National Health Service (NHS). The QR Code present on the vaccination certificate can be used to store the details on a smartphone app.

Prime Minister Boris Johnson announced in July 2021 that once all adults have received their second dose of the vaccine, vaccine cards would be mandatory to gain access to crowded places such as nightclubs.

=== United States ===
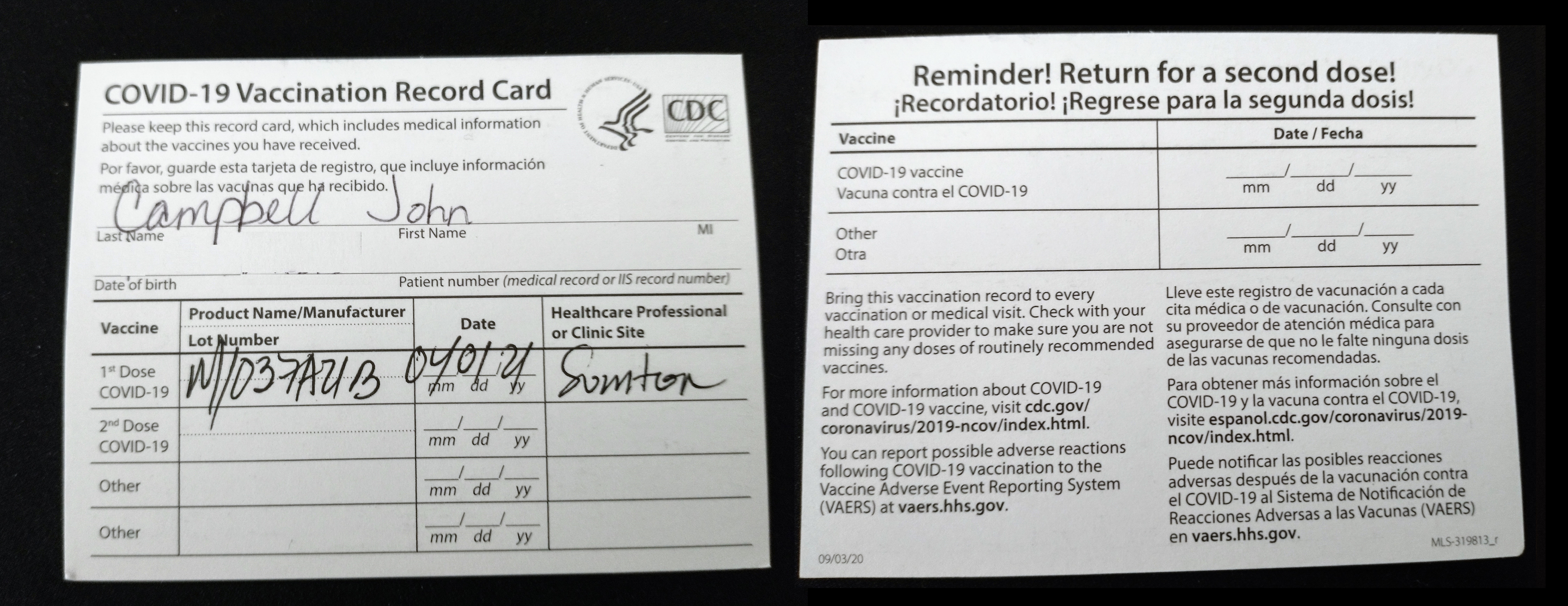
A COVID-19 Vaccination Record Card issued in the United States

Those who receive their vaccination in the United States are given a card with the Centers for Disease Control and Prevention (CDC) and the Health and Human Services (HHS) logos that records their name, the date of each dose, and the brand of the vaccine they have received. In October 2023, the CDC announced it would no longer be issuing COVID-19 vaccine cards.

Some states provide a digital record of vaccination to their residents, using a QR code that can be verified with a scanner app. New York has the Excelsior Pass which also records the results of COVID-19 tests while California has the California Digital COVID-19 Vaccine Record.

== Issues ==
=== Posting on social media ===
Many vaccine recipients have posted pictures of their vaccine cards on social media. This risks the exposure of personal information that is unsafe to share with the public.

=== Forgery ===
Fake vaccine cards have been sold on the Internet. Sales of these cards have increased substantially since some businesses started requiring proof of vaccination to gain entry. Existing laws prohibit the sale and use of these forgeries.

In September 2021, a woman in the United States was arrested for using a fake vaccine card to bypass mandatory vaccination requirements. The arrest was made after it came to light that the card said Maderna instead of Moderna in the vaccine name. The same month, U.S. Customs and Border Protection seized more than 6,000 counterfeit vaccine cards across the country with two mail packages in Pittsburgh originating from China. Prior to this, several vendors were found selling fake vaccine cards on e-commerce platforms such as Amazon.

In Russia, a black market for fake vaccine cards emerged soon after the government started requiring them for various activities.

At a Dutch nightclub, clubgoers presenting the Q-codes of digital certificates belonging to others led to an outbreak that infected 160 people.

=== Theft of authentic cards ===
A Chicago pharmacist sold 125 authentic vaccination cards online to 11 different buyers and was charged with 12 counts of theft of government property, with a potential sentence of ten years in prison for each count. A contractor at the Pomona Fairplex in California stole 528 blank vaccination cards and was charged with felony grand theft.

== See also ==
- Immunity passport
- Vaccine passports during the COVID-19 pandemic
