= Infectious Disease Act =

The Infectious Disease Act is an Act of the Parliament of Finland.

== Amendments ==
On September 22, 2021, the Finnish Parliament voted to adopt an amendment to the Act, removing the "close contact" definition in Section 58d, a temporary provision that applied to public spaces in restaurants, stores, and other venues.

On October 15, 2021, the Parliament voted to amend the Act to adopt rules for using COVID-19 passports to access certain public spaces while COVID-19 restrictions are in force.
