= Vaccine passports during the COVID-19 pandemic =

Use of immunity passports for COVID-19 vaccination

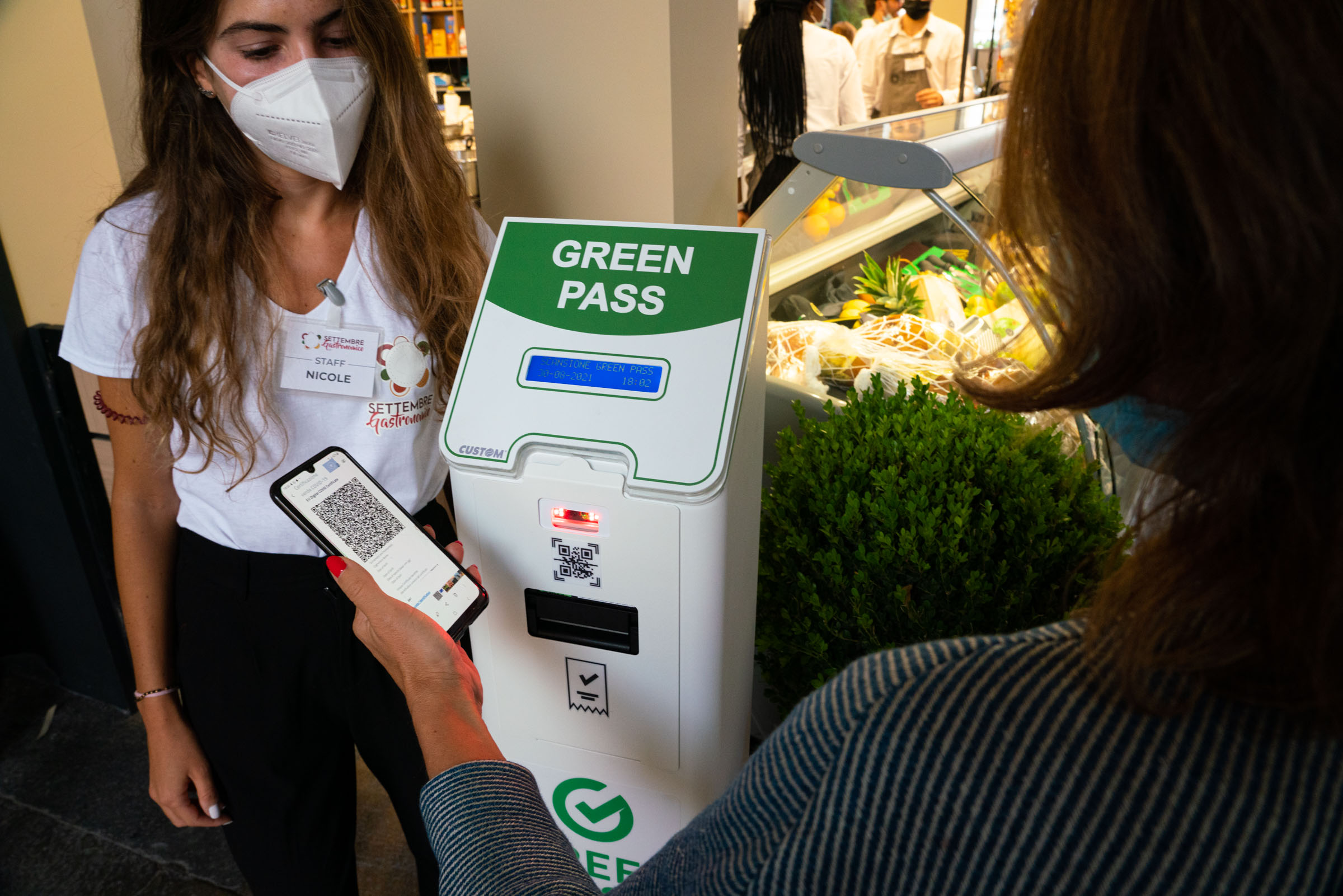
An EU Green Pass in digital format being scanned before entering a bistro in Parma, Italy

A vaccine passport or proof of vaccination was an immunity passport employed as a credential in countries and jurisdictions as part of efforts to control the COVID-19 pandemic via vaccination. A vaccine passport was typically issued by a government or health authority, and usually consisted of a digital or printed record (such as a vaccine card, QR code, or digital authentication).

The use of vaccine passports was based on the general presumption that a vaccinated individual would be less likely to transmit SARS-CoV-2 to others, and less likely to experience a severe outcome (hospitalization or death) if they were to be infected, thus making it relatively safer for them to congregate. A vaccine passport was typically coordinated with policies enforced by individual businesses, or enforceable public health orders, that required patrons to present proof of vaccination for COVID-19 as a condition of entry or service; in the latter case, these requirements were intended to improve uptake of the vaccines, which in turn would allow for the gradual easing of overall public health restrictions.

Government-mandated use of vaccine passports during the COVID-19 pandemic typically applied to discretionary public spaces and events (such as indoor restaurants, bars, and large-scale in-person events, such as concerts and sports), and not essential businesses, such as retail stores or health care. In France, Italy, Ireland, and Canada, vaccine uptake increased after various levels of governments announced plans to introduce vaccine passports.

Vaccine passports were controversial and raised scientific, ethical and legal concerns. England initially decided against mandating vaccine passports due to worries that discrimination and economic harm would occur, but later joined the other nations of the United Kingdom in mandating vaccine passports due to the threat of the Omicron variant.

The concept proved divisive in the United States; Canada, the UK and much of the European Union citing civil liberties and privacy concerns. The U.S. federal government left the matter to individual states. While some cities and states chose to implement a vaccine passport rule, others explicitly banned them in certain public and private sector contexts, arguing that they discriminate against those who made a personal choice to not receive the vaccine. A federal proof of vaccination requirement for land-based border crossings into Canada by essential workers resulted in the 2022 Canadian trucker protest in Ottawa, backed largely by liberty-oriented groups.

== History and background ==
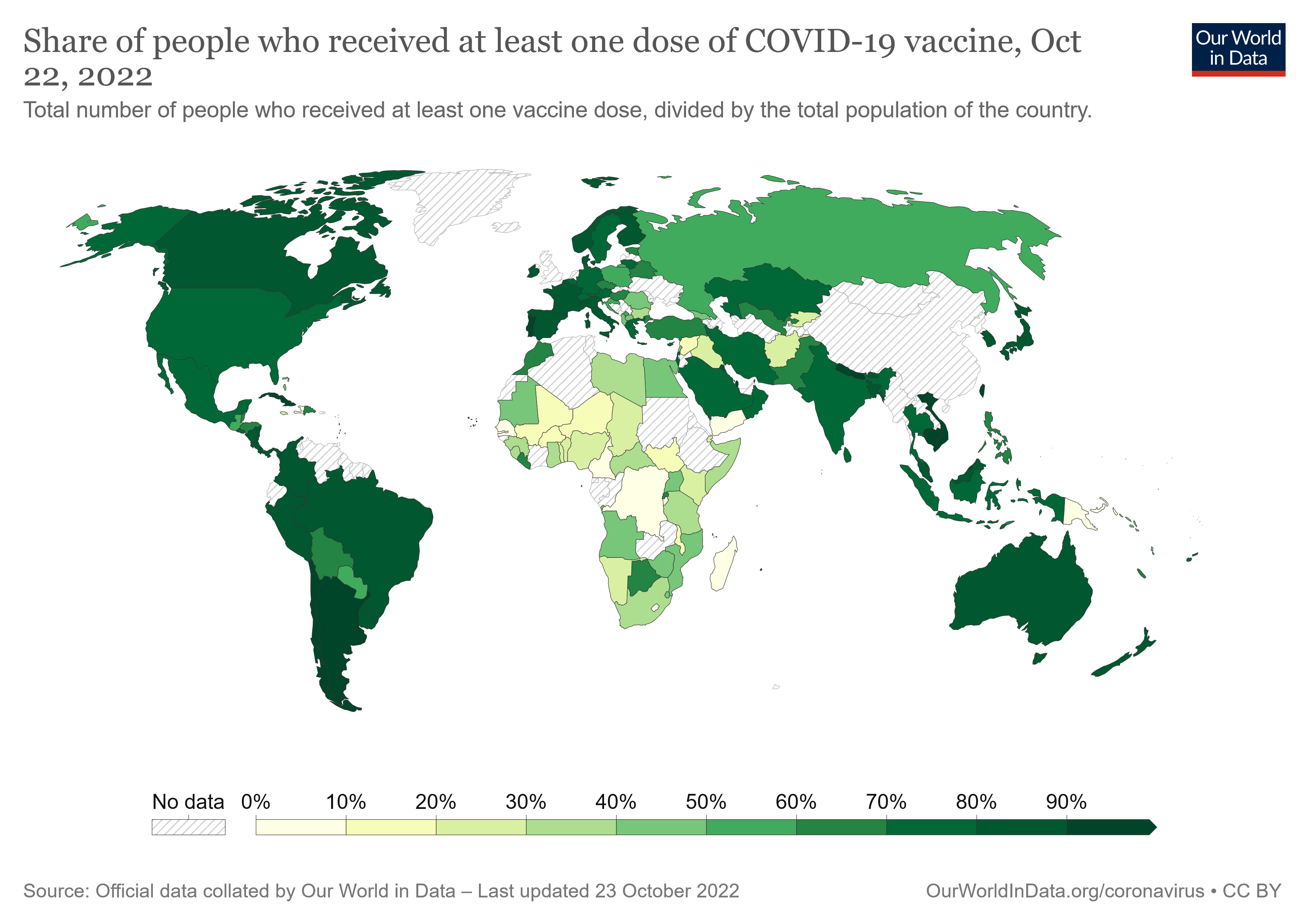
Countries by percentage of people who have received at least one dose of a COVID-19 vaccine. Date is at the bottom of the map.

Many governments, including Finland and Germany, expressed early interest in the concept. Vaccine passports were seen as a potential way to permit a faster economic recovery from large-scale lockdowns that applied to all residents (especially within the travel and tourism industries), improve the confidence of patrons concerned for their health and safety, and incentivize vaccination in order for a population to potentially reach "herd immunity".

In May 2020, Chile started issuing "release certificates" to patients who had recovered from COVID-19, but stated tha the documents did not yet certify immunity. Many governments including Finland, Germany, the United Kingdom, and the United States expressed interest in the concept.

The Royal Society published a report on 19 February 2021, where a lead author of the report, Professor Melinda Mills, Director of the Leverhulme Centre for Demographic Science at the University of Oxford said: “Understanding what a vaccine passport could be used for is a fundamental question – is it literally a passport to allow international travel or could it be used domestically to allow holders greater freedoms? The intended use will have significant implications across a wide range of legal and ethical issues that need to be fully explored and could inadvertently discriminate or exacerbate existing inequalities.” The report listed 12 essential criteria for an international standard.

On 12 March 2021, Ecma International announced its intention to create an international standard which prevented counterfeits and protected private data as much as possible in a "Call for Participation on Vaccine Passports International Standardization" that referenced the earlier report from the UK's Royal Society. In August 2021, Ecma International announced revisions to Ecma-417 (Architectures for distributed real-time access systems) relevant to standards for vaccine passports.

An early advocate of immunity passports during the COVID-19 pandemic was Sam Rainsy, the Cambodian opposition leader. In exile and under confinement in Paris, he proposed immunity passports as a way to help restart the economy in a series of articles which he began in March 2020 and published in The Geopolitics and The Brussels Times. The proposals were also published in French. The idea became increasingly relevant as evidence of lasting acquired immunity became clear. Rainsy and other proponents of the idea, argued that immunity, whether acquired naturally or through vaccination, was a resource which needed to be used to limit the impact of the pandemic on the global economy. Many people in Cambodia depended entirely for their living on a tourism industry which had been wiped out during the pandemic. Poor countries could also benefit from recording immunological status as this would reduce wastage of scarce vaccines. The immunity passport proposed by Rainsy was effectively adopted in the EU under the name of "health pass".

It was initially unclear whether vaccinated people who remained asymptomatic were still contagious and were thus silent spreaders of the virus putting unvaccinated people at risk. "A lot of people are thinking that once they get vaccinated, they’re not going to have to wear masks anymore," said Michal Tal, an immunologist at Stanford University. "It’s really going to be critical for them to know if they have to keep wearing masks, because they could still be contagious."

In January 2021, Israel announced that Israelis who had received their second vaccination and those who had proof of recovery from infection would be eligible for a Green Pass, exempting them from isolation requirements and mandatory COVID-19 tests, including those on arrival from overseas. In February 2021, Israel became one of the first countries to implement a vaccine passport system, dubbed the Green Pass. They were required to access venues such as gyms, hotels, bars, and restaurants. In October 2021, Israel announced an update to its guidelines, requiring the most recent vaccine dose (or proof of recovery) to have been during the past six months. This change made Israel the first country to make a booster shot a requirement for its vaccine passport system.

== By region ==
=== Africa ===
==== Morocco ====
In August 2021, Morocco established a nightly curfew between 23:00 and 04:30, exempting those fully vaccinated. The curfew was lifted in November 2021.

=== Asia ===
==== Azerbaijan ====
Beginning on 1 September 2021, Azerbaijan required proof of vaccination for people over 18 to enter virtually all public spaces, and a national mandate of 1 October required vaccination of all state-regulated workers.

==== China ====
In February 2020, China started to use digital "health codes", available on a variety of platforms including WeChat and Alipay with scannable QR barcodes displaying a "traffic light" system of colours to enter public transport, shops, restaurants and malls. It was used 40 billion times between February and March.

In March 2021, an "International Travel Health Certificate" was created. In March 2021, the government of China rolled out the world's first COVID-19 vaccine passport system through a partnership with Alipay and WeChat. The system provided a health certificate that included an individual's vaccine status and the results of COVID-19 testing. Initially, the system would only indicate that an individual had been vaccinated if they received a Chinese-made coronavirus vaccine, leading to criticism, though by April 2021 the system began to accept records of receiving the Pfizer-BioNTech, Moderna, and Janssen vaccines. By March 2021, the app was optional and its use was restricted to Chinese citizens. The digital health passport was intended to better facilitate travel. Privacy advocates and Chinese netizens expressed concerns regarding the potential of invasive data collection and the use of data for non-health monitoring purposes.

==== Iran ====
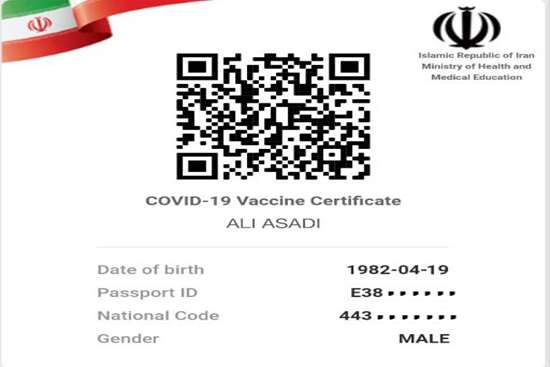
Iranian card

The Ministry of Health and Education required a passport number and Iranian national ID card code for issuing vaccine digital foreign travel card.

==== Israel ====
Israel was one of the first countries to issue what is known as a Green Pass in February 2021. The pass was discontinued on 1 June 2021, but following a surge of new infections, it was reinstated on 29 July 2021. In October 2021, all existing Green Passes were voided if the most recent shot was administered more than 6 months ago. A new pass would be issued upon proof of a third (booster) dose or a recovery within the past 6 months. A temporary Green Pass could also be obtained with a negative viral test, but would be paid for by the individual unless ineligible for vaccination. Starting 1 March 2022, most COVID-19 regulations were relaxed, and a Green Pass was only required to enter old age homes.

==== Japan ====
On 19 July 2021, Japan began accepting applications for its COVID-19 vaccination passport program. When issued, the passports would be in paper form in both Japanese and English, showing the holder's date(s) of inoculation and the vaccine type, and would be available free of charge. By 20 December 2021, entry restrictions were relaxed for Japan vaccine passport holders in 76 countries.

==== Saudi Arabia ====
Residents attending restaurants, cafes and public spaces like malls, shopping centres and markets were required to be fully vaccinated. The country used the Tawakkalna app which included information for health appointments, vaccination status and alerted users to COVID-19 exposure for contact tracing purposes.

==== Singapore ====
Beginning on 10 August 2021, all residents dining out were required to be fully vaccinated by showing proof of vaccination using the TraceTogether or HealthHub app, or use the TraceTogether token. Proof of vaccination had been progressively implemented in almost all public venues beginning on 13 October 2021, starting with shopping malls, retail shops, entertainment venues except bars, nightclubs and karaoke parlours, attractions, cruises and eateries. It was later expanded to include large events, public libraries, selected events at community buildings and also tertiary institutions, places of lodging, small events and workplaces from January 2022.

==== South Korea ====
On 1 November 2021, a vaccine passport system went into effect in South Korea as part of a "living with COVID-19" strategy, requiring vaccination of all residents wishing to access high-risk areas such as bars, restaurants, gyms and saunas.

==== Taiwan ====
On 25 October 2021, the Taiwanese government announced that the digital COVID certificate system in the country had been completed. In December 2021, the system was also recognised by the EU as an equivalent of the EU Digital Covid Certificate. On 20 January 2022, Taiwan officially released the certificate and implemented rules that it be required before entering bars or karaoke alike.

=== Europe ===
==== European Union ====
The European Union offered an EU Digital COVID Certificate (EUDCC), also known as the Green Pass, a digitally-signed proof of vaccination, proof of a recent recovery, or a recent negative test, for use when travelling within the Schengen area with fewer restrictions.

===== Bulgaria =====
On 19 October 2021, the caretaker Minister of Health of Bulgaria, Stoycho Katsarov, introduced the Green Certificate (Bulgarian: Зелен Сертификат). Starting 21 October 2021, all visitors to cinemas, theaters, concerts, museums, galleries, supermarkets over 300 square meters, fitness centers, gyms, restaurants and entertainment centers in Bulgaria had to prove that they were vaccinated, had a valid negative test within last 72 hours or had not been ill recently. The restrictions ended on 10 March 2022.

===== Denmark =====
Denmark introduced a Coronapas on 21 April 2021. Those unvaccinated with a recently negative test of 72 hours or previous infection of COVID-19 of up to 12 weeks prior were included in the pass system. Due to the high uptake of vaccines, Denmark retired their system on 10 September 2021.

===== France =====
France issued a Health Pass (or Pass Sanitaire in French) on 9 August 2021, for use in non-essential settings for those 18 and older. To obtain the pass people had to be fully vaccinated or undertake a test within 72 hours of attending a non-essential space or had recovered recently from an infection of the virus. The initial announcement of the pass system was believed to have encouraged an additional one million people to sign up for vaccination the day following the announcement, and was credited to encouraging a further 3.7 million people to sign up for vaccination in the following week. Starting 1 October 2021, those aged 12 and older were required a Pass Sanitaire to enter public sites like restaurants, cinemas, and sporting events.

===== Germany =====
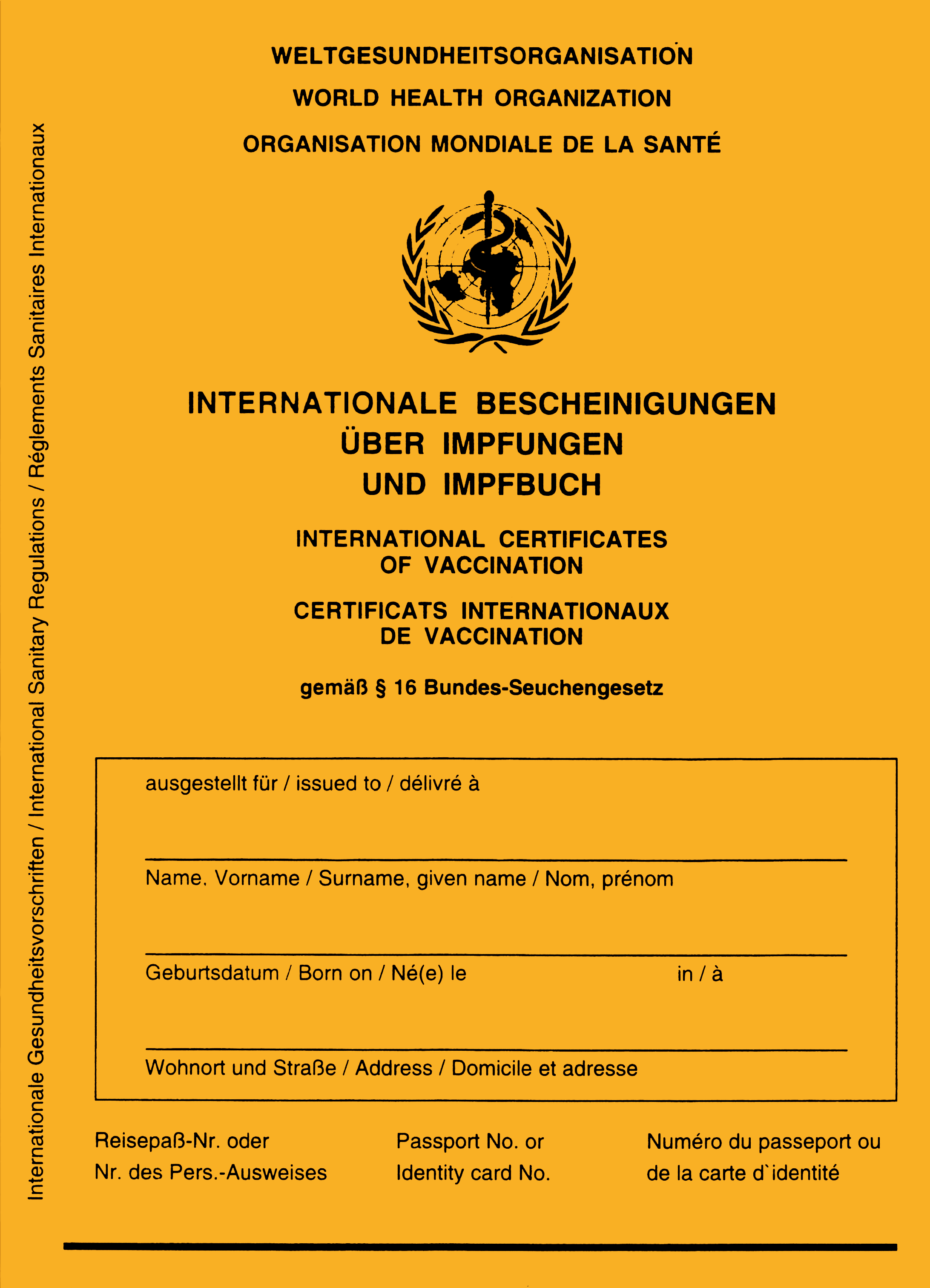
The standard yellow vaccine booklet used in Germany.

In Germany, proof of COVID vaccinations or recent recovery, was typically entered in the International Certificate of Vaccination or Prophylaxis (German: Impfausweis), similar to how other vaccinations for other diseases are recorded. The entry in this booklet could be used to acquire an EU Digital COVID Certificate, in accordance with EU Directive 2021/953, effective 1 July 2021.

===== Hungary =====
Outside of the application of the EUDCC, Hungary recognised Kazakh and Indian vaccine passports.

===== Ireland =====
In July 2021, Ireland introduced a vaccine certificate program (EU Digital COVID Certificate) which allowed vaccinated individuals to attend cafes, bars and restaurants. Due to one of the highest uptakes of COVID-19 vaccines in the world, the Republic of Ireland (but not Northern Ireland) had plans to retire their vaccine passport program on 22 October 2021, however, this was postponed due to increased COVID-19 cases and hospital numbers. On 22 January 2022, the Republic of Ireland's vaccine passport programme was retired, except for international travel.

===== Italy =====
In August 2021, the Italian government extended the requirement of the EU Digital COVID Certificate, also known as a Green Pass, to the participation in sports events and music festivals, but also to access indoor places like bars, restaurants and gyms, as well as long-distance public transportation. On 15 October 2021, Italy became the first country in the world to require its entire workforce, public and private, to have a government-issued health pass.

===== Sweden =====
On 1 December 2021, the Swedish government introduced vaccine passports for indoor events with more than 100 people. Indoor events with more than 100 participants who did not use vaccination certificates were required follow specific guidelines to avoid spreading the disease.

===== Ukraine =====
In Ukraine, citizens with at least one dose of a vaccine were allowed to attend certain high-risk indoor settings which would normally be closed or heavily restricted in hot spots.

===== United Kingdom =====
Proof of vaccination programs existed in the Home Nations of the United Kingdom, with England and Wales referring to them as "NHS COVID Pass", Scotland as "NHS Scotland Covid Status", and Northern Ireland as "COVIDCert NI". By December 2021, all four nations had mandated proof of vaccination or a recent negative test in specific settings. The exact rules varied by nation, but they primarily applied to venues such as cinemas, nightclubs, and venues hosting large organized events (including but not limited to concerts and sporting events).

In September 2021, Secretary of Health Sajid Javid stated that England would not implement a mandate for proof of vaccination, following pushback from Conservative members of parliament and business leaders over potential discrimination and economic harm. Prime Minister Boris Johnson subsequently stated that England would focus on a strategy of contact tracing, rapid testing, and the rollout of vaccine boosters, and only included mandatory proof of vaccination in a package of "plan B" measures (including a reintroduction of mask mandates) in the event of another surge of COVID-19 cases. The spread of Omicron variant in England would lead to the implementation of "plan B", resulting in proof of vaccination for nightclubs and large events becoming mandatory beginning 15 December. These restrictions ended on 27 January 2022.

===== North Macedonia =====
Residents wishing to attend events, bars, restaurants, and other dining establishments had to present proof of vaccination.

=== North America ===
==== Canada ====
Vaccine passport status in Canada: No plans for a vaccine passport Partial vaccine passport program in effect Vaccine passport program in effect Terminated vaccine passport

An example proof of vaccination adhering to Canadian federal standards.

The implementation of digital proof of vaccination in Canada was largely conducted at the provincial and territorial level, with the federal government specifying the SMART Health Card document and QR code standard designed to be suitable for international travel.

By November 2021, all ten provinces in Canada, and two of the three territories, had implemented or announced plans to implement a provincially-regulated vaccine passport.

==== Federal requirements and mandates ====
Beginning 30 October 2021, proof of vaccination became mandatory for all passengers aged 12 and older boarding domestic and/or international commercial airplanes departing from most Canadian airports, and those riding on the cross-country Via Rail services.

Travellers by land (via the United States border) were required to be fully vaccinated to enter Canada, and required to provide a negative test 72 hours before land crossing. An exception was made for essential workers until January 15 2022, when essential workers (mainly truckers) were required to be fully vaccinated to re-enter the country. In late-January 2022, a convoy to a demonstration in the federal capital of Ottawa—supported primarily by far-right activists and groups—was held to protest this change.

===== Alberta =====
Alberta implemented the Restrictions Exemption Program (REP) from 20 September 2021 to 8 February 2022, after re-establishing a state of emergency on 15 September 2021. The government described the program as an opt-in system, allowing establishments to operate with fewer restrictions. Visitors at these establishments were required to present a proof of vaccination or a recent negative test. If a facility did not participate, or was prohibited from participating, it was required to comply with all public health orders, such as reduced capacity and/or being prohibited from offering indoor dining.

Due to Omicron variant, even establishments participating in REP became subject to restrictions in December 2021, including restrictions on the capacity of large venues (50%), and restaurants subject to limits on table sizes, a prohibition on entertainment, and operating hours.

The city of Calgary passed a municipal bylaw on 23 September 2021 to mandate participation in REP by all industries that were eligible to do so. The bylaw ceased on 9 February 2022 due to the lifting of the REP by the provincial government. The city considered reimplementing the mandate at the municipal level (as had several U.S. cities) but such a proposal was rejected by the city council committee.

===== Manitoba =====
Manitoba was the first province to introduce a passport system in Canada on 17 July 2021. The passport requirement was removed for movie theatres, museums and galleries on 7 August 2021, only to be reinstated on 3 September 2021, upon Manitoba expanding its passport system. The province utilized physical Immunization Cards which faced supply shortages in production.

===== Quebec =====
Quebec was the second province to implement a vaccine passport system on 1 September 2021, using QR codes.

===== Northwest Territories =====
The Northwest Territories implemented an opt-in vaccine passport system on 22 October 2021 using original vaccination receipts.

===== Other provinces =====
- British Columbia created a Proof of vaccination system which utilised a QR code. The system initially relied on paper receipts of the BC vaccine receipt and gradually migrated to a digital system. The QR code could also be physically printed out.
- New Brunswick required a Proof of Vaccination system using original immunisation records.
- Newfoundland and Labrador had plans to release a QR code based system for their vaccine passport.
- Nova Scotia had a Proof of Full Vaccination Policy using original government issued proof of vaccination.
- Ontario introduced a vaccine passport system on 22 September 2021. The system initially relied on original vaccine paper receipts, but gradually began switching over to verifiable QR codes along with the introduction of the "Verify Ontario" mobile app on 22 October 2021. By 4 January 2022, only vaccine receipts with verifiable QR codes and the "Verify Ontario" mobile app were accepted at venues where proof of vaccine was required.
- Prince Edward Island used the PEI Vax Pass Program using original government issued vaccination information.
- Saskatchewan had a Proof of vaccination mandate, effective from 1 October 2021 to 13 February 2022.
- Yukon territory planned to implement a passport system on 30 November 2021 to access non-essential indoor facilities.

==== United States ====
A map showing which US states proposed or implemented (green), banned (red), or partially banned (yellow) COVID-19 vaccine passports. Gray indicates that the state has neither implemented or banned COVID-19 vaccine passports. Also included is states that have significant localities with COVID-19 vaccine passports (Aqua). Green includes states which have created a vaccine passport mobile application, but the application is not mandated to be used in the public or private sector. As of October 2021, no US states had mandated use of vaccine passports.

The Centers for Disease Control and Prevention (CDC) issued a COVID-19 vaccine card that could be accepted as proof of vaccination; however, it was vulnerable to forgery and counterfeiting, and thus not considered a verifiable proof of vaccination. The United States' federal government ruled out adopting a framework for a digital vaccine passport, citing privacy and human rights concerns; this left their implementation to individual states and territories.

Prior to the eventual political outcry, public views on vaccine passports were evenly split and the divide crossed political and ideological lines. 21 Republican-led states to varying degrees went on to ban public agencies from issuing or requiring a vaccine passport, while Alabama, Florida, Iowa, Utah, Montana, and Texas also made it illegal for any private entity to request proof of vaccination as a condition of service. This was an effort to limit discrimination against those who have made a personal choice to not get vaccinated. House Republicans also argued that requiring knowledge of one's vaccine status was a violation of data privacy rules and an illicit means of tracking the population.

The state governments of California, Hawaii, Louisiana, New York, North Carolina, Delaware, and Virginia allowed residents to choose to receive proof of COVID-19 vaccination in the form of a scannable QR code by linking to records within each state's immunization registry. Illinois had a Vax Verify website, where residents could download proof of COVID-19 vaccination for businesses that required it. In New Jersey, residents could obtain a digital COVID-19 vaccination record through its mobile app Docket; Governor Phil Murphy specifically avoided using the term "vaccine passport" to describe the service.

Each state credential had varying degrees of interoperability with other state and foreign governments; some states had closed systems, with QR codes that were only usable within the issuing state, and others had broad interoperability, with New York offering both types of credentials for its residents. Arizona, Maryland, Mississippi, North Dakota, Washington, West Virginia, Puerto Rico, and the District of Columbia contracted with the organization MyIR that interfaced with governmental vaccination records to produce a PDF proof of vaccination, but had also moved toward scannable QR codes. Health departments in Indiana, Colorado, and Georgia could provide proof of vaccination in PDF form but not via a QR code.

===== Los Angeles County =====
Los Angeles County began a proof of vaccination system for indoor bars, restaurants, venues and nightclubs on 7 October 2021.

===== New York City =====
New York City began its Excelsior Pass or Key to NYC vaccine passport system for dining, fitness, events and indoor entertainment on 13 September 2021.

==== Chicago ====
Chicago began requiring a vaccine passport on January 3 2022 for indoor spaces such as restaurants, bars, gyms, and entertainment venues.

===== New Orleans =====
New Orleans began to require proof of vaccination or a negative test to enter indoor bars, restaurants, events, fitness, and sporting events on 16 August 2021.

=== South America ===
==== Brazil ====
In December 2020, the Brazilian Senate approved a document giving digital proof of all vaccinations – not just those with respect to COVID-19. However, the urgency for creating such a digital proof of vaccination came from the COVID-19 pandemic.

==== Chile ====
In May 2021, then Health Ministry Subsecretary, Paula Daza, mandated the "mobility pass" (pase de movilidad) in gyms, restaurants and swimming pools. This document was given to people with two doses of the COVID-19 vaccine, later it was upscaled to three doses and later on in the same year, four doses were required, being one of the most drastic vaccines passports in the world. Chile was the only country in the world with entry procedures such as requiring homologation of vaccines to travel to.

=== Oceania ===
==== Australia ====
Australia required proof of vaccination for international travel. The federal government also maintained a vaccine registry while individual states such as New South Wales and Victoria required vaccines to enter indoor venues.

==== New Zealand ====
On 17 November 2021, the New Zealand Government launched a vaccine certificate called My Vaccine Pass for individuals who had been vaccinated against COVID-19. The vaccine pass was required to enter hospitality venues, community, sport and faith-based gatherings as defined by the COVID-19 Protection Framework. They came into force on 29 November 2021. On 23 November, the New Zealand Government launched the NZ Pass Verifier to scan the passes.
On April 5, 2022, vaccine passes were no longer required for most venues. On June 1, 2022, all vaccine passes became invalid, and were no longer be required for any venue.

== Arguments and controversy ==
By September 2021, the World Health Organization (WHO) acknowledged that mandatory COVID-19 vaccine passports would be discriminatory against countries with little access to vaccinations, but could eventually be considered for international travel when vaccine access improved.

=== Effect on vaccine uptake ===
In some jurisdictions, vaccine uptake increased after various levels of governments announced plans to mandate their use.

=== Ethical and social issues ===
The ethical issues that arose in the acceptability of vaccine passports revolved around the policy objectives and the intended use. The public health restriction on implementing vaccine passports limited the freedom of an individual to perform social activities.

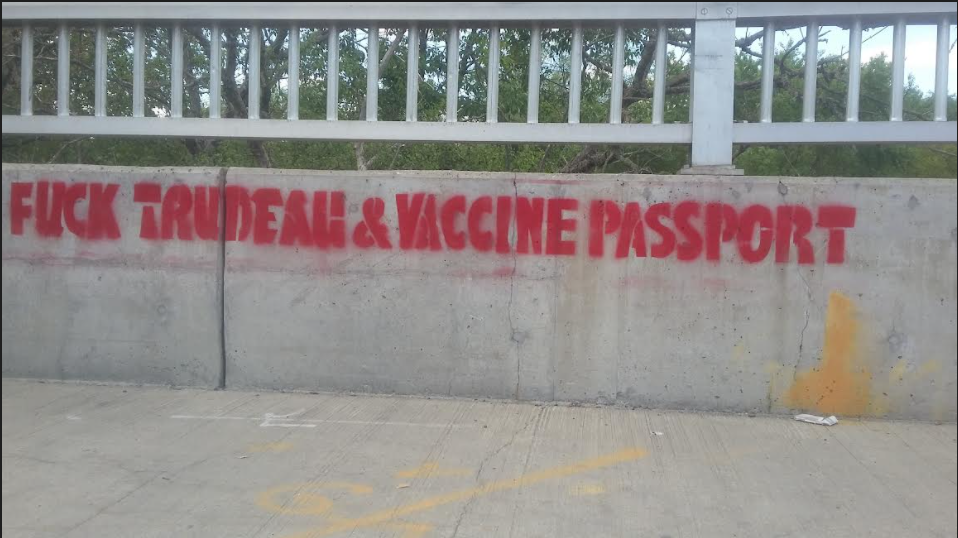
Anti vaccine-mandate graffiti in Toronto, Canada (2021)

People who were privileged to receive the vaccination gained access to going back to normal life while low-income populations remained disproportionately low on vaccinations which hindered their ability to participate in non-essential activities.

Due to the imbalance in the distribution of vaccines in the developing world, there were concerns about the inequity of vaccine passports for travellers. On 15 April 2021, the World Health Organization's emergency committee opposed vaccination passports, saying, "States parties are strongly encouraged to acknowledge the potential for requirements of proof of vaccination to deepen inequities and promote differential freedom of movement". "Some sort of vaccine certificate will be important" to reboot travel and tourism, according to Dr. David Nabarro, special envoy on COVID-19 for the WHO, in February 2021.

In March 2021, Bernardo Mariano, the WHO's Director of Digital Health and Innovation, said that "We don't approve the fact that a vaccination passport should be a condition for travel." Lawmakers in several US states also considered legislation to prohibit COVID-19 vaccination passports.

Ethical concerns about vaccine passports were also raised by the Human Rights Watch (HRW). According to HRW, requiring vaccine passports for work or travel would force people into taking tests or risk losing their jobs, create a perverse incentive for people to intentionally infect themselves to acquire immunity certificates, and risk creating a black market of forged or otherwise falsified vaccine cards. By restricting social, civic, and economic activities, it was feared vaccine passports may "compound existing gender, race, ethnicity, and nationality inequities." Immunity certificates also faced privacy and human rights concerns.

=== Digital privacy ===
A security vulnerability in the app used by New Jersey and Utah briefly made it possible to request the QR codes of other users, containing encoded name, date of birth, and vaccination history information. On 24 September 2021, Saskatchewan Health Authority stated that digital vaccine records obtained in the province between 19 and 24 September may have accidentally contained the wrong QR code for the specific user.

=== Natural immunity ===
People may acquire a degree of natural immunity from SARS-CoV-2 when they are exposed to the live virus, and develop a primary immune response which produces antibodies that can recognize specific variants. By May 2021, the WHO reported that more than 90% of individuals established recognizable antibodies within four weeks after an infection. For most people, these detectable antibodies roughly stayed for at least 6–8 months. However, antibodies may not guarantee immunity from novel variants and mutations of SARS-CoV-2. The uncertainty of the science behind immunity to SARS-CoV-2 raised issues over their applicability within passport frameworks.

It was also argued that the primary difference was that vaccination certificates such as the Carte Jaune incentivized individuals to obtain vaccination against a disease, while immunity passports incentivized individuals to get infected with and recover from a disease.

== See also ==
- COVID-19 vaccine card
- COVID-19 vaccine
- Deployment of COVID-19 vaccines
- Electronic health record
- Living with COVID-19
- Patient record access
- Vaccination requirements for international travel
