= Far-right politics in Canada =

Far-right politics in Canada may refer to:

- Neo-Nazism in Canada
- Fascism in Canada
- Ku Klux Klan in Canada
