= 2023 Chinese healthcare reform protests =

Pensioner protests in China

- Part of protest and dissent in China
- Date: 8 and 15 February 2023, 7 March 2023
- Location: Wuhan and Dalian, China
- Caused by: Expenses resulting from the Chinese government's zero-COVID policy
- Methods: Protests, demonstrations and protest songs

Parties
(Republic of China (1912–1949)) Opposition	Government of China: Chinese Communist Party

Lead figures
	(China) Xi Jinping

Number
Thousands of protesters (8 February 2023)	

The 2023 Chinese healthcare reform protests were a series of simultaneous pensioner protests in the months that followed China's 2022 COVID-19 protests and the subsequent end of China's zero-COVID policies. On 15 February 2023, simultaneous mass protests of mostly elderly pensioners broke out in both Wuhan and Dalian.

== Background ==
The Chinese government announced that they are reducing subsidies for personal accounts in favor of pooled accounts, but some individuals raised concerns about the government's actual use of the funds. Yanzhong Huang, a senior fellow for Global Health at the Council on Foreign Relations (CFR), has suggested that the government's decision may not have been adequately explained to the public.

China's healthcare system has long faced funding issues, and these challenges have only worsened in recent years due to the high cost of zero-COVID policies. As a result, local and regional authorities have attempted to cut back on spending, often at the expense of healthcare benefits for the elderly.

== Protests ==
On 8 February 2023, thousands of retirees in Wuhan gathered in front of the city government to protest the slashing of medical subsidies.

On 15 February 2023, protests erupted in both Wuhan and Dalian in response to new health insurance reforms related to ongoing struggles within China's healthcare system and cash-strapped localities struggling to recover from zero-COVID expenditures. Most of the demonstrators were elderly citizens who opposed recent changes to the local healthcare insurance system, claiming that the reforms would make medical care more costly and reduce their access to it.

During the demonstration, a group of protesters chanted various slogans, including "down with the reactionary government". In addition, they sang "The Internationale", a song that has been associated with communist movements across the globe and recently repurposed for use at protests in China.

== Reactions ==
In response to the protests, there was a large police presence in both cities, with some protestors alleging that local authorities were aware of the events in advance. Some individuals in Wuhan were asked "not to hold illegal protests, gatherings or demonstrations in public spaces" or post protest content on social medias.

== Commentary ==
Researchers at Freedom House's China Dissent Monitor (CDM) noted that, while isolated protests throughout China are common, the topic of the protests was notable. Other commentators saw the protests as building on the previous year's anti-COVID-zero protests, albeit with a different age cohort and following the rapid dismantlement of Zero-COVID and the resulting reopening outbreak which led to the deaths of multiple prominent seniors. It also remained to be seen, in mid-February, whether the dual-city protests would similarly develop into a multi-site decentralized protest movement of its own.
