= Belt-sander racing =

Practice of racing belt sanders competitively

Belt-sander racing is the practice of racing belt sanders competitively. Belt sanders may have been one of the first power tools used in the growing field of power tool drag racing wherein a pair of stock or modified belt sanders are placed in parallel wooden channels and fitted with long extension cords. Each heat begins when a common switch or individual switches triggered by the racers energizes them, causing the sanders to race towards the end of the track spitting wood dust along the way. Both stock sanders and modified sanders race down a 75-foot-long (23 m) track. Sanders of all shapes and sizes can go very fast, or very slow depending on the power of the motor. The fastest time on a 75-foot track was 2.2103 seconds recorded by Dudley Harper's Sudden Death Racer of San Marcos, Texas. Sudden Death raced on that date at the Legends Raceway in Rockport, Texas. The peak velocity of that belt sander at the finish line was in the range of 50–60 miles per hour (80–97 km/h).

== Fundraising ==
For more than two decades, Bertie's Inn in Exeter Township, Pennsylvania, near the city of Reading has held a fundraiser called Bertie's Inn Belt Sander Race. Riders sit on and race hand-held belt sanders on a 40-foot-long plywood track. All team entry fees ($50), food sales and T-shirts sales are donated to the National Multiple Sclerosis Society. To date they have raised over $370,000 for the charity. Their most recent race was July 13, 2019. The 30th annual race scheduled for 2020 was cancelled due to the COVID-19 restrictions prohibiting large gatherings.
