= Endemic COVID-19 =

Current stage of COVID-19 disease

COVID-19 is an endemic disease according to most experts. Unlike a pandemic, an endemic disease occurs at predictable and manageable levels. This transition has made COVID-19 data more difficult to track. The observed behavior of SARS-CoV-2, the virus that causes COVID-19, suggests it is unlikely to die out, and the lack of a COVID-19 vaccine that provides long-lasting immunity against infection means it cannot immediately be eradicated; thus, transition to an endemic phase was probable. In an endemic phase, people continue to become infected and ill, but in relatively stable numbers. Such a transition was thought to take years or decades. Precisely what would constitute an endemic phase is contested.

The word endemic is frequently misunderstood and misused outside the realm of epidemiology. Endemic does not mean mild, or that COVID-19 must become a less hazardous disease. The severity of endemic disease would be dependent on various factors, including the evolution of the virus, population immunity, and vaccine development and rollout.

COVID-19 endemicity is distinct from the COVID-19 public health emergency of international concern, which was ended by the World Health Organization on 5 May 2023. Some politicians and commentators conflated what they termed endemic COVID-19 with the lifting of public health restrictions or a comforting return to pre-pandemic normality. The transition point of a pandemic into an endemic state is not well-defined, and whether this has occurred differs according to the definitions used.

== Definition and characteristics ==
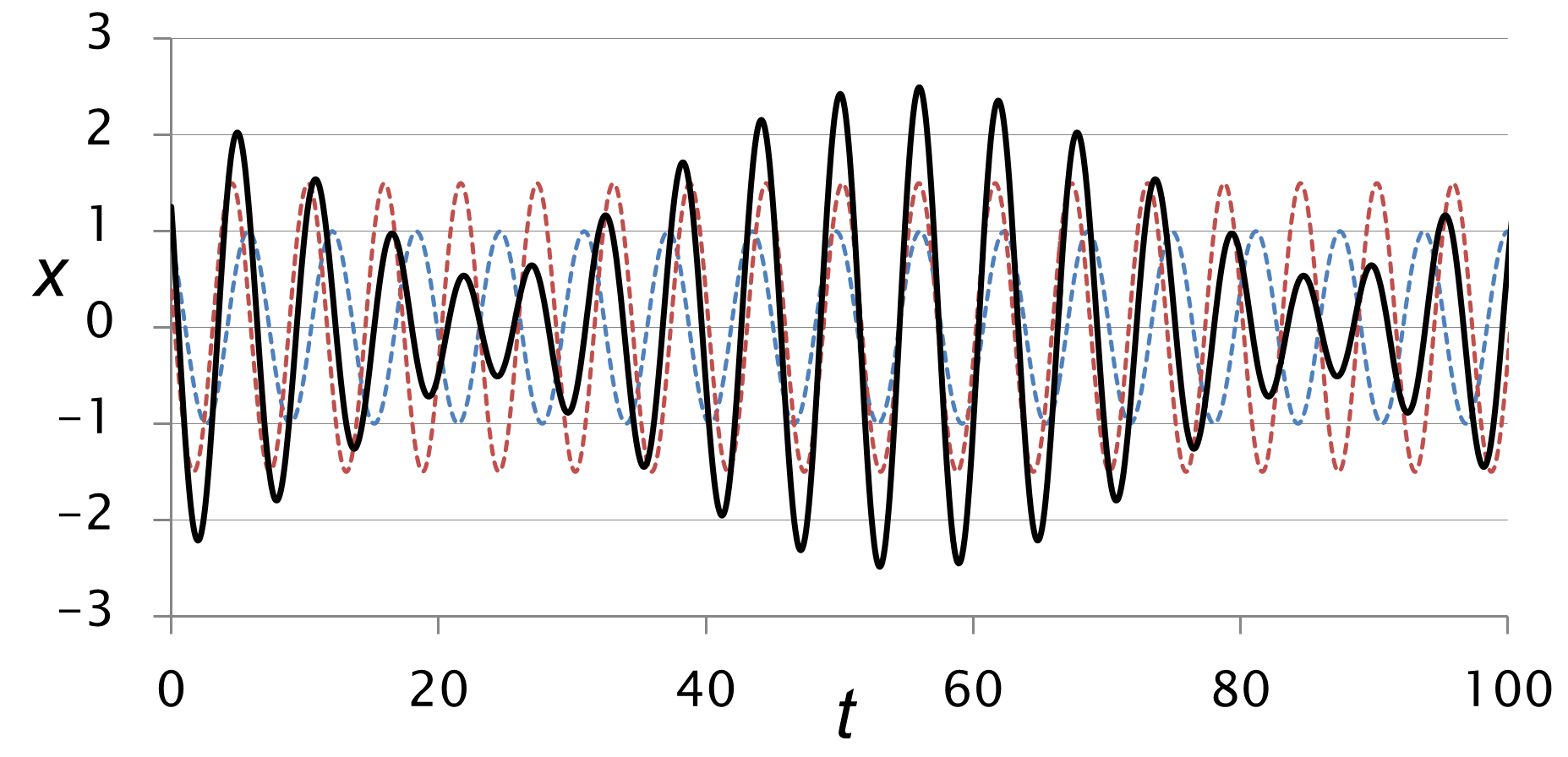
In an endemic phase, the number of infections can be high or low, as long as it stays within the predicted range.

An infectious disease is said to be endemic when the number of infections is predictable. This includes diseases with infection rates that are predictably high (called hyperendemic), as well as diseases with infection rates that are predictably low (called hypoendemic). Endemic does not mean mild: a disease with a stable infection rate can be associated with any level of disease severity and any mortality rate among infected people. Endemic COVID-19 is not a synonym for COVID-19 infection becoming safe, or for mortality and morbidity becoming less of a problem. The prevalence and resulting disease burden is dependent on factors such as how quickly new variants emerge, the uptake of COVID-19 vaccines, and changes to disease virulence (a factor that depends on both the virus's own characteristics and people's immunity against it), rather than being dependent on endemicity.

Generally speaking, all new emerging infectious diseases have five potential outcomes:

- Eradication – eventually, the disease dies out completely. This is not expected for COVID-19.
- Sporadic spread – unpredictable individual outbreaks that, due to any combination of factors limiting transmissibility (including changes to people's behavior), tend not to spread out of the immediate chain of infections. This was briefly achieved early in the pandemic in a few smaller countries through rigorous surveillance measures, but it is not an expected outcome for COVID-19 globally.
- Epidemic – also called local or regional spread, this is most commonly the result of some inherent qualities of the infection, such as how soon contagious people become symptomatic, and some behaviors, such as how much contact people have and whether they use any effective non-pharmaceutical interventions to limit spread of the virus. This is not expected for COVID-19, as people often become contagious before they develop any symptoms.
- Pandemicity – a global outbreak, often associated with a new pathogen that no one has any immunity against. COVID-19 became a pandemic shortly after the first cases were identified.
- Endemicity – a common outcome for most emerging infections diseases that began with a pandemic phase, including pandemic influenza. Many experts expected COVID-19 to become endemic.

Additionally, if an infectious disease becomes endemic, there is no guarantee that the disease will remain endemic forever. A disease that is usually endemic can become epidemic or pandemic in the future. For example, in some years, influenza becomes a pandemic, even though it is not usually a pandemic.

During the course of the COVID-19 pandemic, it became apparent that the SARS-CoV-2 virus was unlikely to die out. Eradication is widely believed to be impossible, especially in the absence of a vaccine that provides long-lasting immunity against infection from COVID-19.

While all of the other outcomes are possible – sporadic, epidemic, pandemic, or endemic – many experts believe that COVID-19 is most likely remain endemic. Endemicity is characterized by continued infections by the virus, but with a more stable, predictable number of infected people than in the other three categories.

== Seasonal pattern ==
Since its emergence in late 2019, COVID-19 has shown periodic surges in transmission. While winter peaks have been common, significant outbreaks have also occurred during summer months. For example, winter surges are often associated with colder temperatures, increased indoor activity, and reduced ventilation. Summer surges have been linked to travel, large gatherings, and the emergence of new variants.

== Endemic epidemiology ==
A March 2022 review said that it was "inevitable" the SARS-CoV-2 virus would become endemic to humans, and that it was essential to develop public health strategies to anticipate this. A June 2022 review predicted that the virus that causes COVID-19 would become the fifth endemic seasonal coronavirus, alongside four other human coronaviruses. A February 2023 review of the four common cold coronaviruses concluded that the virus would become seasonal and, like the common cold, cause less severe disease for most people.

A review published in 2023 stated that a transition to endemic COVID-19 could take years or decades.

== Determinants ==
The largest determinant of how endemicity manifests is the level of immunity people have acquired, either as a result of vaccination or of direct infection. The severity of a disease in an endemic phase depends on how long-lasting immunity against severe outcomes is. If such immunity is lifelong, or lasts longer than immunity against re-infection, then re-infections will mostly be mild, resulting in an endemic phase with mild disease severity. In other existing human coronaviruses, protection against infection is temporary, but observed reinfections are relatively mild.

Status as an endemic disease requires a stable level of transmission. Anything that could affect the level of transmission could determine whether the disease becomes and remains endemic, or takes another path. These factors include but are not limited to:

- demographic factors, such as changing population sizes and urbanization, which results in changes to the rate at which people have contact with infected people (COVID-19 outbreaks persist longer in dense urban areas) and ageing populations, which remain contagious longer than young adults;
- changes to the climate, which can cause people to move or to have different exposure risks;
- human behavior, such as people traveling, which could cause new variants of SARS-CoV-2 to spread quickly;
- immunity, including both present and future vaccine-based immunity and infection-based immunity, and
- seasonal fluctuations, such as a tendency to go outside during pleasant weather.

Many of the factors that determine whether COVID-19 becomes endemic are not unique to COVID-19.

== Global status ==
On 5 May 2023, the WHO declared that the pandemic was no longer a public health emergency of international concern. The WHO's Director-General, Dr. Tedros Adhanom Ghebreyesus, stated that the pandemic's downward trend over the preceding year "has allowed most countries to return to life as we knew it before COVID-19", though cautioning that new variants could still pose a threat and that the conclusion of the current state of emergency did not mean that the COVID-19 is no longer a worldwide health concern.

== Culture and society ==
According to historian Jacob Steere-Williams, what endemicity means has evolved since the 19th century, and the desire to label COVID-19 as being endemic in early 2022 was a political and cultural phenomenon connected to a desire to see the pandemic as being over.

Paleovirologist Aris Katzourakis wrote in January 2022 that the word endemic was one of the most misused of the COVID-19 pandemic. A 2023 editorial on endemicity in the International Nursing Review journal said that "Traps for unwary politicians and commentators include statements on scientific matters that fall well outside their knowledge and experience, and the danger of adopting and misusing esoteric terminology that has nuanced meanings within professional circles."

When COVID-19 emerged, most people were unfamiliar with the term endemic. Although the representations of endemic COVID-19 in English-language media reports were decidedly negative during the early weeks of the pandemic, since then, the concept of endemicity has been represented in the media as a positive outcome. English-language media coverage, using endemic more like a buzzword to change the public's view of COVID-19 than according to a strict scientific definition, anchored the concept of endemic COVID-19 to seasonal influenza. By December 2021, endemicity was being represented in media as an opportunity that people should seize to "live with the virus" and achieve a "new normal". People were being told that endemicity was a desirable outcome that would achieve not only actual endemicity (a stable, predictable number of infections), but that would also bring them familiar seasonal patterns of infection, manageable demands on healthcare, and a less virulent, relatively harmless disease.

In 2024, the Director-General of the World Health Organization criticised the use of past tense for COVID, citing that the virus remains a cause of acute disease, death and Long COVID that the world "cannot afford... to forget" about.

Media coverage has also objectified endemicity through the metaphor of a journey, especially as the destination at the end of "the path to normality".

== See also ==
- COVID-19 pandemic by country and territory
- Public health mitigation of COVID-19
- Treatment and management of COVID-19
- Law of declining virulence – discredited 19th-century idea that pathogens always become milder over time
