= Flattening the curve =

Public health strategy

Measures such as hand washing, social distancing, and the use of face masks help reduce and delay the peak number of active cases, thereby allowing more time for health care systems to prepare and respond more effectively to increased patient load. The time gained by "flattening the curve" can be used to "raise the line"—that is, to increase health care capacity in order to better meet surging demand.

Without containment measures—such as social distancing, vaccination, and the use of face masks—pathogens can spread exponentially. Early implementation of such interventions can reduce and delay the peak number of active cases, helping to protect a larger proportion of the population. This effect is often visualized through epidemic curves that demonstrate the benefits of early containment.

SIR model showing the impact of reducing the infection rate ($\beta$) by 76%

Flattening the curve is a public health strategy used to slow down the spread of an infectious disease in order to prevent overwhelming health care systems. The curve being flattened refers to the epidemic curve, a visual representation of the number of infected people needing health care over time. During an epidemic, health care systems can become overwhelmed when the number of people infected exceeds their capacity to provide adequate care. Flattening the curve reduces the peak number of infected people requiring care at any one time, helping ensure that the healthcare system remains within its capacity to treat patients. This strategy gained widespread attention during the early stages of the COVID-19 pandemic as governments sought to manage the spread of the SARS-CoV-2 virus.

The strategy relies on mitigation measures such as hand washing, use of face masks, and social distancing. A related concept is "raising the line", which involves increasing health care capacity – for example, by expanding the availability of intensive care unit (ICU) beds and ventilators. Flattening the curve and raising the line are complementary strategies that work together to reduce mortality and ensure the health care system can continue providing care.

Flattening the curve is distinct from "zero-COVID" strategies, which aim to eliminate transmission entirely. Instead, flattening the curve tolerates low levels of community transmission while aiming to minimize disruption and protect vulnerable populations. These strategies may be pursued sequentially or simultaneously during different phases of an epidemic, particularly as population-level immunity is acquired through infection or vaccination.

== Background ==
Warnings about the risk of pandemics were repeatedly made throughout the 2000s and the 2010s by major international organisations including the World Health Organization (WHO) and the World Bank, especially after the 2002–2004 SARS outbreak. Governments, including those in the United States and France, both prior to the 2009 swine flu pandemic, and during the decade following the pandemic, both strengthened their health care capacities and then weakened them. At the time of the COVID-19 pandemic, health care systems in many countries were functioning near their maximum capacities.

In a situation like this, when a sizable new epidemic emerges, a portion of infected and symptomatic patients create an increase in the demand for health care that has only been predicted statistically, without the start date of the epidemic nor the infectivity and lethality known in advance. If the demand surpasses the capacity line in the infections per day curve, then the existing health facilities cannot fully handle the patients, resulting in higher death rates than if preparations had been made.

An influential UK study showed that an unmitigated COVID-19 response in the UK could have required up to 46 times the number of available ICU beds. One major public health management challenge is to keep the epidemic wave of incoming patients needing material and human health care resources supplied in a sufficient amount that is considered medically justified.

== Flattening the curve ==
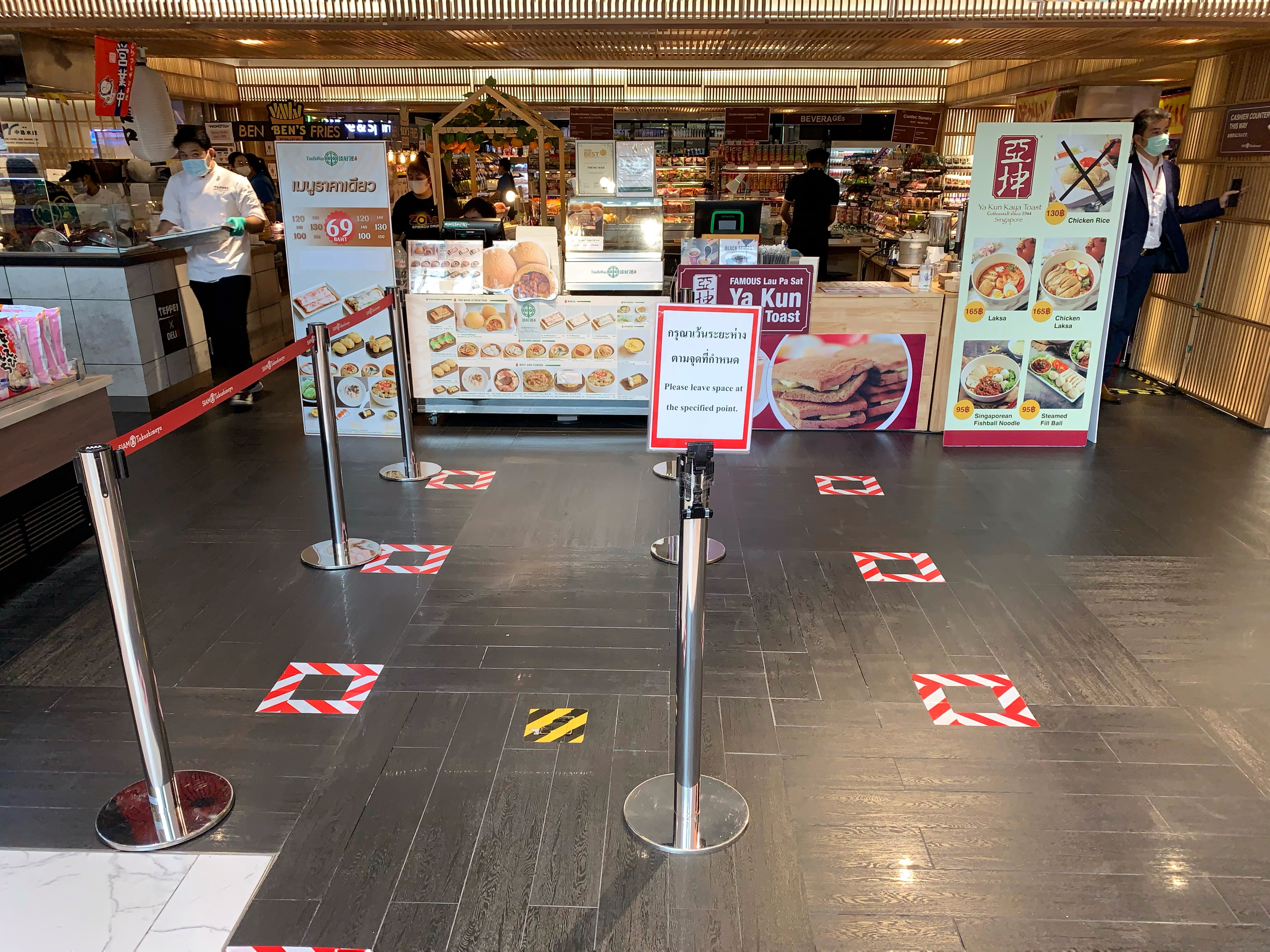
Queue markers at a shopping mall in Bangkok as a social distancing practice

Non-pharmaceutical interventions such as hand washing, social distancing, isolation and disinfection reduce the daily infections, therefore flattening the epidemic curve. A successfully flattened curve spreads health care needs over time and the peak of hospitalizations under the health care capacity line. Doing so, resources, be it material or human, are not exhausted and lacking. In hospitals, it is vital for medical staff to use the proper protective equipment and procedures, but also to separate contaminated patients and exposed workers from other populations to avoid patient-to-doctor or patient-to-patient spreading. The origins of the expression date back to 2007, though during the COVID pandemic the expression became a repeated "sound bite" used by numerous medical and non-medical individuals in the media.

== Raising the line ==
Along with the efforts to flatten the curve is the need for a parallel effort to "raise the line", to increase the capacity of the health care system. Healthcare capacity can be raised by raising equipment, staff, providing telemedicine, home care and health education to the public. Elective procedures can be cancelled to free equipment and staffs. Raising the line aims to provide adequate medical equipment and supplies for more patients.

== During the COVID-19 pandemic ==
Simulations comparing the rate of infection spread and resulting fatalities due to overwhelmed hospital capacity under two conditions: normal social interaction (left, 200 individuals moving freely) versus social distancing (right, 25 individuals moving freely): Healthy, uninfected; Infected; Recovered; Dead

The concept was popular during the early months of the COVID-19 pandemic.

According to Vox, in order to move away from social distancing and return to normal, the US needed to flatten the curve by isolation and mass testing, and to raise the line. Vox encouraged building up health care capability including mass testing, software and infrastructures to trace and quarantine infected people, and scaling up cares including by resolving shortages in personal protection equipment, face masks.

According to The Nation, territories with weak finances and health care capacity such as Puerto Rico faced an uphill battle to raise the line, and therefore a higher imperative pressure to flatten the curve.

In March 2020, UC Berkeley Economics and Law professor Aaron Edlin commented that ongoing massive efforts to flatten the curve supported by trillions dollars emergency package should be matched by equal efforts to raise the line and increase health care capacity. Edlin called for an activation of the Defense Production Act to order manufacturing companies to produce the needed sanitizers, personal protective equipment, ventilators, and set up hundreds thousands to millions required hospital beds. Standing in March 2020 estimates, Edlin called for the construction of 100-300 emergency hospitals to face what he described as "the largest health catastrophe in 100 years" and to adapt health care legislation preventing emergency practices needed in time of pandemics. Edlin pointed out proposed stimulus package as oriented toward financial panics, while not providing sufficient funding for the core issue of a pandemic: health care capability.

By 2021, the phrase "flatten the curve" had largely fallen out of medical messaging etymology.

== See also ==
- SIR model
- Basic reproduction number (R_{0})
- Quarantine
- Imperial College COVID-19 Response Team
- List of countries by hospital beds
