= Public health mitigation of COVID-19 =

Measures to halt the spread of the respiratory disease among populations

Public gathering rules during COVID

Goals of mitigation include delaying and reducing peak burden on healthcare (flattening the curve) and lessening overall cases and health impact. Moreover, progressively greater increases in healthcare capacity (raising the line) such as by increasing bed count, personnel, and equipment, help to meet increased demand.

Mitigation attempts that are inadequate in strictness or duration—such as premature relaxation of distancing rules or stay-at-home orders—can allow a resurgence after the initial surge and mitigation.

Generally, managing an infectious disease outbreak consists of trying to delay and decrease the epidemic peak, known as flattening the epidemic curve. This decreases the risk of health services being overwhelmed and provides more time for vaccines and treatments to be developed. Non-pharmaceutical interventions that may manage the outbreak include personal preventive measures such as hand hygiene, wearing face masks, and self-quarantine; community measures aimed at physical distancing such as closing schools and cancelling mass gathering events; community engagement to encourage acceptance and participation in such interventions; as well as environmental measures such as surface cleaning. It has also been suggested that improving ventilation and managing exposure duration can reduce transmission.

In most countries, restrictions had been lifted by May 2023, and everyday life had returned to how it was before the pandemic due to improvement in the pandemic's situation.

== Initial containment measures ==
More drastic actions aimed at containing the outbreak were taken in China once the severity of the outbreak became apparent, such as quarantining entire cities or imposing strict travel bans. Other countries also adopted a variety of measures aimed at limiting the spread of the virus, including resorting to states of emergency. South Korea, in March 2020, introduced mass screening and localised quarantines and issued alerts on the movements of infected individuals. Singapore provided financial support for those infected who quarantined themselves and imposed large fines for those who failed to do so. Taiwan increased face mask production and penalised hoarding of medical supplies. The zero-COVID approach aims to prevent viral transmission, using a number of different measures, including vaccination and non-pharmaceutical interventions such as contact tracing and quarantine. Different combinations of measures are used during the initial containment phase, when the virus is first eliminated from a region, and the sustained containment phase, when the goal is to prevent reestablishment of viral transmission within the community. Experts differentiate between zero-COVID, which is an elimination strategy, and mitigation strategies that attempt to lessen the effects of the virus on society but which still tolerate some level of transmission within the community. These initial strategies can be pursued sequentially or simultaneously during the acquired immunity phase through natural and vaccine-induced immunity.

== Costs and challenges ==
Simulations for Great Britain and the United States show that mitigation (slowing but not stopping epidemic spread) and suppression (reversing epidemic growth) have major challenges. Optimal mitigation policies might reduce peak healthcare demand by two-thirds and deaths by half but still result in hundreds of thousands of deaths and overwhelmed health systems. Suppression can be preferred but needs to be maintained for as long as the virus is circulating in the human population (or until a vaccine becomes available), as transmission otherwise quickly rebounds when measures are relaxed. Until now, the evidence for public health (nonpharmaceutical) interventions such as social distancing, school closure, and case isolation comes mainly from epidemiological compartmental models and, in particular, agent-based models (ABMs). Such models have been criticized for being based on simplifying and unrealistic assumptions. Still, they can be useful in informing decisions regarding mitigation and suppression measures in cases when ABMs are accurately calibrated. An Argentinian modelling study asserted that complete lockdowns and healthcare system overextension could be avoided if 45 percent of asymptomatic patients were detected and isolated. Long-term intervention to suppress the pandemic has considerable social and economic costs.

== Efficacy ==
In August 2020, a working paper by the National Bureau of Economic Research (NBER) questioned major effects of many mitigation and suppression measures. The authors compared the development of casualties connected to SARS-CoV-2 until July 2020 in 25 US states and 23 countries that had counted more than 1,000 overall deaths each. From the date a state passed a threshold of 25 deaths, the statistical study observed a largely uniform development, independent of the type and time frame of governmental interactions. Thus, the growth rate of casualties dropped to zero within 20–30 days, and the variability between regions was low, except at the beginning of the epidemics. The authors computed the effective reproduction number R_{eff} with the aid of different models like the SIR model and found it hovering around one everywhere after the first 30 days of the epidemic. Hence, they did not find evidence for an influence of lockdowns, travel restrictions, or quarantines on virus transmission. For contradicting studies, they assume an omitted variable bias. Candidates for ignored effects could be voluntary social distancing, the structure of social interaction networks (some people contact more networks faster than others), and a natural tendency of an epidemic to spread quickly at first and slow down, which has been observed in former Influenza pandemics, but not yet completely understood. The reviewer Stephen C. Miller concludes “that human interaction does not conform to simple epidemiological models”.

Many reviews find high efficacy of mitigation measures such as vaccines, face masks and social distancing. For instance, a systematic review and meta-analysis found that mask-wearing cuts the incidence of COVID-19 by 53% overall. The efficacy may also be substantially higher, especially if certain types of masks are worn or under specific conditions and settings.

== Contact tracing ==
Manual contact tracing via mandatory traveler health forms at New York City's LaGuardia Airport in August 2020.

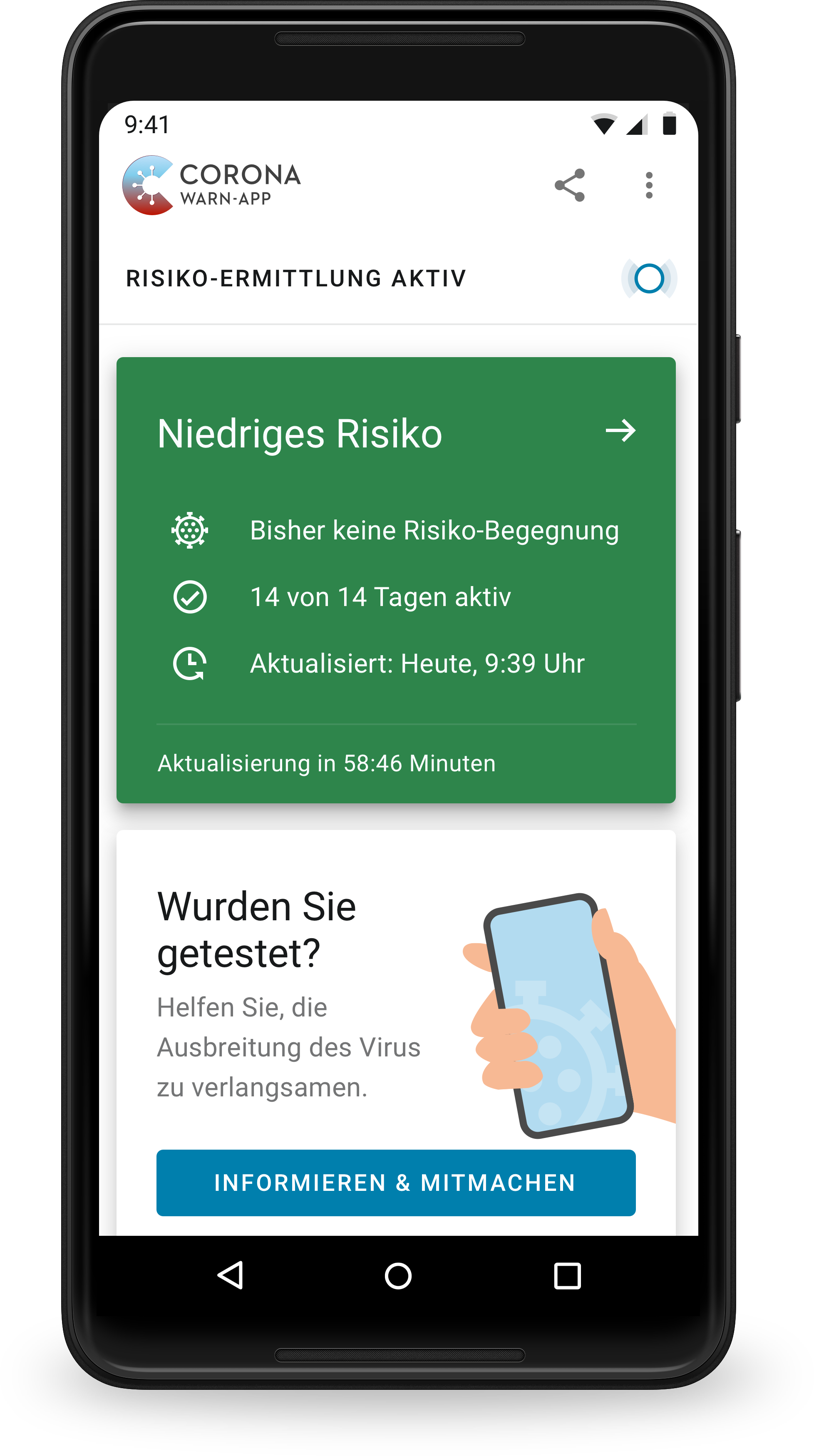
The contact tracing app "Corona-Warn-App"

Contact tracing is an important method for health authorities to determine the source of infection and to prevent further transmission. The use of location data from mobile phones by governments for this purpose has prompted privacy concerns, with Amnesty International and more than a hundred other organisations issuing a statement calling for limits on this kind of surveillance.

An unencumbered and always entirely voluntary use of such digital contact tracing apps by the public was found to be low even if the apps are built to preserve privacy (which may, however, compete with alternative domestic apps that don't do so and can't always be used), leading to low usefulness of the software for pandemic mitigation as of April 2021. A lack of possible features, prevalent errors, and possibly other issues reduced their usefulness further. Use of such an app in general or during specific times is in many or all cases not provable or required.

Moreover, contact-tracing apps may be designed with criteria (<1 metre; and > 15 minutes contact) insufficient for controlling danger.

=== Information technology ===
Several mobile apps have been implemented or proposed for voluntary use, and as of 7 April 2020 more than a dozen expert groups were working on privacy-friendly solutions such as using Bluetooth to log a user's proximity to other cellphones. (Users are alerted if they have been near someone who subsequently tests positive.)

On 10 April 2020, Google and Apple jointly announced an initiative for privacy-preserving contact tracing based on Bluetooth technology and cryptography. The system is intended to allow governments to create official privacy-preserving coronavirus tracking apps, with the eventual goal of integration of this functionality directly into the iOS and Android mobile platforms. In Europe and in the U.S., Palantir Technologies is also providing COVID-19 tracking services.

In February 2020, China launched a mobile app to deal with the disease outbreak. Users are asked to enter their name and ID number. The app can detect 'close contact' using surveillance data and therefore a potential risk of infection. Every user can also check the status of three other users. If a potential risk is detected, the app not only recommends self-quarantine, but it also alerts local health officials.

Big data analytics on cellphone data, facial recognition technology, mobile phone tracking, and artificial intelligence are used to track infected people and people whom they contacted in South Korea, Taiwan, and Singapore. In March 2020, the Israeli government enabled security agencies to track mobile phone data of people supposed to have coronavirus. According to the Israeli government, the measure was taken to enforce quarantine and protect those who may come into contact with infected citizens. The Association for Civil Rights in Israel, however, said the move was "a dangerous precedent and a slippery slope". Also in March 2020, Deutsche Telekom shared aggregated phone location data with the German federal government agency, Robert Koch Institute, to research and prevent the spread of the virus. Russia deployed facial recognition technology to detect quarantine breakers. Italian regional health commissioner Giulio Gallera said he has been informed by mobile phone operators that "40% of people are continuing to move around anyway". The German Government conducted a 48-hour weekend hackathon, which had more than 42,000 participants. Three million people in the UK used an app developed by King's College London and Zoe to track people with COVID-19 symptoms. The president of Estonia, Kersti Kaljulaid, made a global call for creative solutions against the spread of coronavirus.

== Health care ==
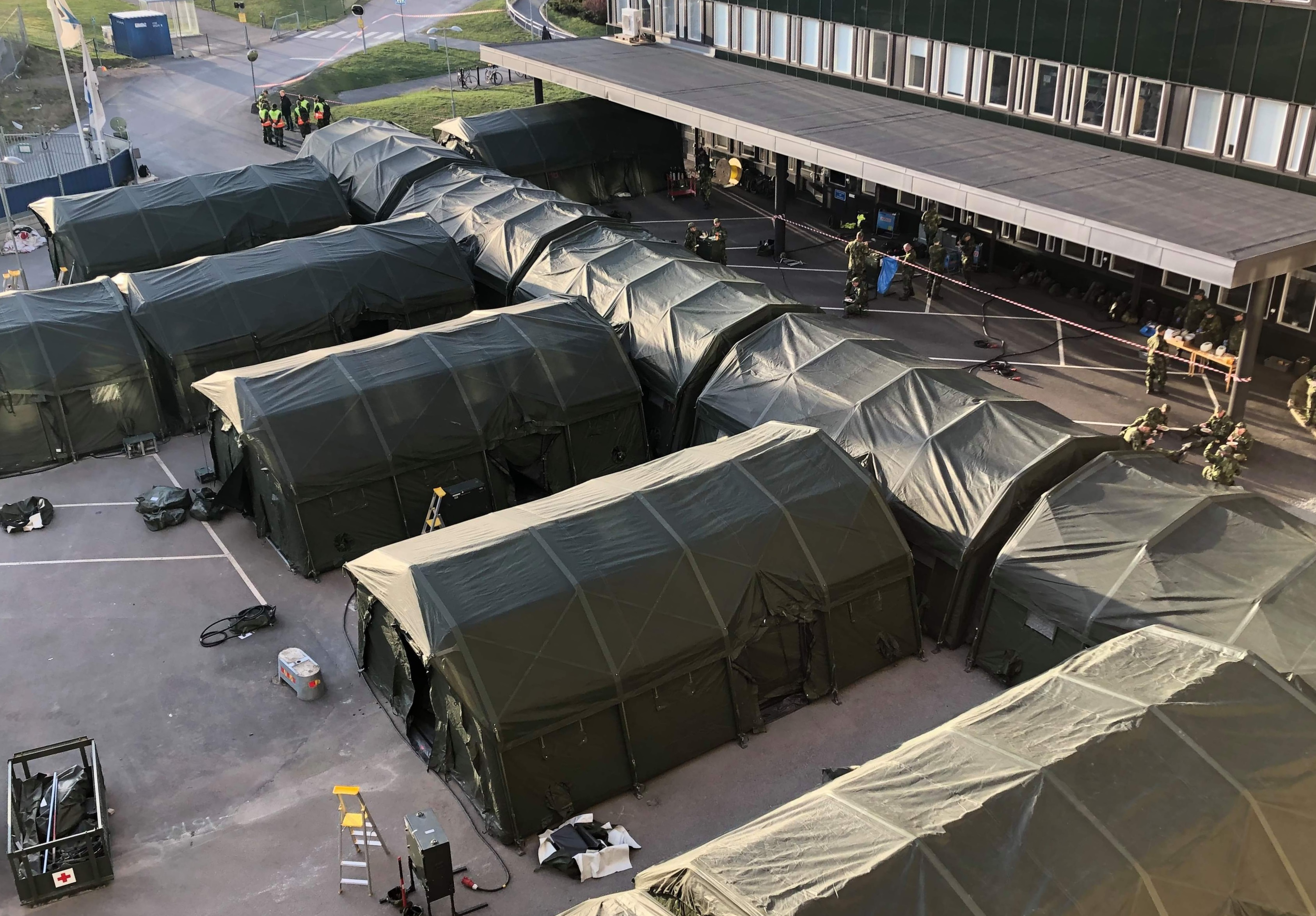
An army-constructed field hospital outside Östra sjukhuset (Eastern hospital) in Gothenburg, Sweden, contains temporary intensive care units for COVID-19 patients.

Increasing capacity and adapting healthcare for the needs of COVID-19 patients is described by the WHO as a fundamental outbreak response measure. The ECDC and the European regional office of the WHO have issued guidelines for hospitals and primary healthcare services for shifting of resources at multiple levels, including focusing laboratory services towards COVID-19 testing, cancelling elective procedures whenever possible, separating and isolating COVID-19-positive patients, and increasing intensive care capabilities by training personnel and increasing the number of available ventilators and beds. In addition, in an attempt to maintain physical distancing, and to protect both patients and clinicians, in some areas non-emergency healthcare services are being provided virtually.

== Research and development ==
There are research-based developments that aim to mitigate COVID-19 spread beyond vaccines, repurposed and new medications, and similar conventional measures.

Researchers investigate safe ways of public transport during the COVID-19 pandemic.

Novel vaccine passports have been developed.

Researchers are developing face masks that could be more effective at reducing SARS-CoV-2 spread than existing ones and/or have other desired properties such as biodegradability and better breathability. Some are also researching attachments to existing face masks to make them more effective or to add self-cleaning features. The pandemic has increased efforts to develop such masks, and some have received government grants for their development.

Ventilation and air cleaners are also the subject of research and development.

Researchers report the development of chewing gums that could mitigate COVID-19 spread. The ingredients – CTB-ACE2 proteins grown via plants—bind to the virus.

On 23 April 2020, NASA reported building, in 37 days, a ventilator (called VITAL). On April 30, NASA reported receiving fast-track approval for emergency use by the United States Food and Drug Administration for the new ventilator. As of March 2021, 26 manufacturers around the world have been licensed to make the device. The COVID-19 pandemic increased the demand for oxygen concentrators. During the pandemic open source oxygen concentrators were developed, locally manufactured—with prices below imported products—and used, especially during a COVID-19 pandemic wave in India. Due to capacity limitations in the standard supply chains, some manufacturers are 3D printing healthcare material such as nasal swabs and ventilator parts. In one example, when an Italian hospital urgently required a ventilator valve, and the supplier was unable to deliver in the timescale required, a local startup received legal threats due to alleged patent infringement after reverse-engineering and printing the required hundred valves overnight.

== Living with COVID-19 ==
COVID-19 is an endemic disease according to most experts. Unlike a pandemic, an endemic disease occurs at predictable and manageable levels. This transition has made COVID-19 data more difficult to track. The observed behavior of SARS-CoV-2, the virus that causes COVID-19, suggests it is unlikely to die out, and the lack of a COVID-19 vaccine that provides long-lasting immunity against infection means it cannot immediately be eradicated; thus, transition to an endemic phase was probable. In an endemic phase, people continue to become infected and ill, but in relatively stable numbers. Such a transition was thought to take years or decades. Precisely what would constitute an endemic phase is contested.

The word endemic is frequently misunderstood and misused outside the realm of epidemiology. Endemic does not mean mild, or that COVID-19 must become a less hazardous disease. The severity of endemic disease would be dependent on various factors, including the evolution of the virus, population immunity, and vaccine development and rollout.

COVID-19 endemicity is distinct from the COVID-19 public health emergency of international concern, which was ended by the World Health Organization on 5 May 2023. Some politicians and commentators conflated what they termed endemic COVID-19 with the lifting of public health restrictions or a comforting return to pre-pandemic normality. The transition point of a pandemic into an endemic state is not well-defined, and whether this has occurred differs according to the definitions used.

== See also ==
- Treatment and management of COVID-19#Prevention of onward transmission
- Impact of the COVID-19 pandemic on science and technology
