= WAIFW matrix =

Tool for modeling spread of disease

In infectious disease modelling, a who acquires infection from whom (WAIFW) matrix is a matrix that describes the rate of transmission of infection between different groups in a population, such as people of different ages. Used with an SIR model, the entries of the WAIFW matrix can be used to calculate the basic reproduction number using the next generation operator approach.

== Examples ==
The $2 \times 2$ WAIFW matrix for two groups is expressed as
$$\begin{bmatrix} \beta_{11} & \beta_{12} \\ \beta_{21} & \beta_{22} \end{bmatrix}$$
where is the transmission coefficient from an infected member of group $i$ and a susceptible member of group $j$. Usually specific mixing patterns are assumed.

=== Assortative mixing ===
Assortative mixing occurs when those with certain characteristics are more likely to mix with others with whom they share those characteristics. It could be given by
$$\begin{bmatrix} \beta & 0 \\ 0 & \beta \end{bmatrix}$$
or the general $2 \times 2$ WAIFW matrix so long as $\beta_{11}, \beta_{22} > \beta_{12}, \beta_{21}$. Disassortative mixing is instead when $\beta_{11}, \beta_{22} < \beta_{12}, \beta_{21}$.

=== Homogenous mixing ===
Homogenous mixing, which is also dubbed random mixing, is given by
$$\begin{bmatrix} \beta & \beta \\ \beta & \beta \end{bmatrix}$$
. Transmission is assumed equally likely regardless of group characteristics when a homogenous mixing WAIFW matrix is used. Whereas for heterogenous mixing, transmission rates depend on group characteristics.

=== Asymmetric mixing ===
It need not be the case that $\beta_{ij} = \beta_{ji}$. Examples of asymmetric WAIFW matrices are

$$\begin{bmatrix} \beta_1 & \beta_2 \\ \beta_1 & \beta_2 \end{bmatrix}
\begin{bmatrix} \beta_1 & \beta_1 \\ \beta_2 & \beta_2 \end{bmatrix}
\begin{bmatrix} 0 & \beta_1 \\ \beta_2 & 0 \end{bmatrix}$$

== Social contact hypothesis ==
The social contact hypothesis was proposed by Jacco Wallinga, Peter Teunis, and Mirjam Kretzschmar in 2006. The hypothesis states that transmission rates are proportional to contact rates, $\beta_{ij} \propto c_{ij}$ and allows for social contact data to be used in place of WAIFW matrices.

== See also ==
- Mathematical modelling of infectious disease
- Next-generation matrix
