= Force of infection =

Rate at which susceptible individuals acquire an infectious disease

In epidemiology, force of infection (denoted $\lambda$) is the rate at which susceptible individuals acquire an infectious disease. Because it takes account of susceptibility it can be used to compare the rate of transmission between different groups of the population for the same infectious disease, or even between different infectious diseases. That is to say, $\lambda$ is directly proportional to $\beta$; the effective transmission rate.

$$\lambda = \frac {\mbox{number of new infections}} {\mbox{number of susceptible persons exposed} \times \mbox{average duration of exposure}}$$

Such a calculation is difficult because not all new infections are reported, and it is often difficult to know how many susceptibles were exposed. However, $\lambda$ can be calculated for an infectious disease in an endemic state if homogeneous mixing of the population and a rectangular population distribution (such as that generally found in developed countries), rather than a pyramid, is assumed. In this case, $\lambda$ is given by:

$$\lambda = \frac {1} {A}$$

where $A$ is the average age of infection. In other words, $A$ is the average time spent in the susceptible group before becoming infected. The rate of becoming infected ($\lambda$) is therefore $1/A$ (since rate is 1/time). The advantage of this method of calculating $\lambda$ is that data on the average age of infection is very easily obtainable, even if not all cases of the disease are reported.

== See also ==
- Basic reproduction number
- Compartmental models in epidemiology
- Epidemic
- Mathematical modelling of infectious disease
