= Reed–Frost model =

Stochastic epidemic model

The Reed–Frost model is a mathematical model of epidemics put forth in the 1920s by Lowell Reed and Wade Hampton Frost, of Johns Hopkins University. While originally presented in a talk by Frost in 1928 and used in courses at Hopkins for two decades, the mathematical formulation was not published until the 1950s, when it was also made into a TV episode.

== History ==
During the 1920s, mathematician Lowell Reed and physician Wade Hampton Frost developed a binomial chain model for disease propagation, used in their biostatistics and epidemiology classes at Johns Hopkins University. Despite not having published their results, several other academics have done them in their studies. It was not until 1950 that mathematical formulation was published and turned into a television program entitled Epidemic theory: What is it?.

In the program, Lowell Reed, after explaining the formal definition of the model, demonstrates its application through experimentation with marbles of different colors.

The model is an extension of what was proposed by H.E. Soper in 1929 for measles. Soper's model was deterministic, in which all members of the population were equally susceptible to disease and had the ability to transmit disease. The model is also based on the law of mass action, so that an infection rate at a given time was proportional to the number of susceptible and infectious ones at that time. It is effective for moderately large populations, but it does not take into account multiple infections that come into contact with the same individual. Therefore, in small populations, the model greatly overestimates the number of susceptibles that become infected.

Reed and Frost modified the Soper model to account for the fact that only one new case would be produced if a particular susceptible includes contact with two or more cases. The Reed-Frost model has been widely used and served as the basis for the development of more detailed disease propagation simulation studies.

== Description ==
This is an example of a "chain binomial" model, a simplified, iterative model of how an epidemic will behave over time.

The Reed–Frost model is one of the simplest stochastic epidemic models. It was formulated by Lowell Reed and Wade Frost in 1928 (in unpublished work) and describes the evolution of an infection in generations. Each infected individual in generation t (t = 1,2,...) independently infects each susceptible individual in the population with some probability p. The individuals that become infected by the individuals in generation t then constitute generation t + 1 and the individuals in generation t are removed from the epidemic process.

The Reed–Frost model is based on the following assumptions:

1. The infection is spread directly from infected individuals to others by a certain type of contact (termed "adequate contact") and in no other way.
2. Any non-immune individual in the group, after such contact with an infectious individual in a given period, will develop the infection and will be infectious to others only within the following time period; in subsequent time periods, he is wholly and permanently immune.
3. Each individual has a fixed probability of coming into adequate contact with any other specified individual in the group within one time interval, and this probability is the same for every member of the group.
4. The individuals are wholly segregated from others outside the group. (It is a closed population.)
5. These conditions remain constant during the epidemic.

The following parameters are set initially:

- Size of the population
- Number of individuals already immune
- Number of cases (usually set at 1)
- Probability of adequate contact

With this information, a simple formula allows the calculation of how many individuals will be infected, and how many immune, in the next time interval. This is repeated until the entire population is immune, or no infective individuals remain. The model can then be run repeatedly, adjusting the initial conditions, to see how these affect the progression of the epidemic.

The probability of adequate contact corresponds roughly with R_{0}, the basic reproduction number – in a large population when the initial number of infecteds is small, an infected individual is expected to cause $\mathcal{R}_0 = \ln(1/(1-p))$ new cases.

=== Mathematics ===
Let $I_t$ represent the number of cases of infection at time $t$. Assume all cases recover or are removed in exactly one time-step. Let $S_t$ represent the number of susceptible individuals at time $t$. Let $\mathcal{B}(x)$ be a Bernoulli random variable that returns $1$ with probability $x$ and $0$ with probability $1-x$. Making use of the random-variable multiplication convention, we can write the Reed–Frost model as

$$\begin{align}
I_{t+1} &= \sum_{k=0}^{S_t} \mathcal{B}(1-(1-p)^{I_t}), \\
S_{t+1} &= S_t - I_{t+1}\end{align}$$

with initial number of susceptible and infected individuals $(S_0,I_0)$ given. Here, $p$ is the probability that a person comes in contact with another person in one time-step and that that contact results in disease transmission.

The deterministic limit is (found by replacing the random variables with their expectations),

$$\begin{align}
I_{t+1} &= S_t\, (1-(1-p)^{I_t}), \\
S_{t+1} &= S_t\, (1-p)^{I_{t}}\end{align}$$

== See also ==
- Kermack–McKendrick theory
- Mathematical modelling of infectious disease
