= Apparent infection rate =

Mathematical methodology of an infection

Apparent infection rate is an estimate of the rate of progress of a disease, based on proportional measures of the extent of infection at different times.

Firstly, a proportional measure of the extent of infection is chosen as the disease extent metric. For example, the metric might be the proportion of leaf area affected by mildew or the proportion of plants in a population showing dieback lesions. Measures of disease extent are then taken over time, and a mathematical model is fitted. The model is based on two assumptions:

- the progress of the infection is constrained by the amount of tissue that remains to be infected; and
- if it were not so constrained, the extent of infection would exhibit exponential growth.

There is a single model parameter r, which is the apparent infection rate. It can be calculated analytically using the formula

$$r = \frac{1}{t_2-t_1} \log_e \left [ \frac{x_2 (1-x_1)}{x_1 (1-x_2)} \right ]$$

where

r is the apparent infection rate
t_{1} is the time of the first measurement
t_{2} is the time of the second measurement
x_{1} is the proportion of infection measured at time t_{1}
x_{2} is the proportion of infection measured at time t_{2}

== See also ==
- Odds ratio
- Basic reproduction number
