= Compartmental models (epidemiology) =

Type of mathematical model used for infectious diseases

Compartmental models are a mathematical framework used to simulate how populations move between different states or "compartments". While widely applied in various fields, they have become particularly fundamental to the mathematical modelling of infectious diseases. In these models, the population is divided into compartments labeled with shorthand notation – most commonly S, I, and R, representing Susceptible, Infectious, and Recovered individuals. The sequence of letters typically indicates the flow patterns between compartments; for example, an SEIS model represents progression from susceptible to exposed to infectious and then back to susceptible again.

These models originated in the early 20th century through pioneering epidemiological work by several mathematicians. Key developments include Hamer's work in 1906, Ross's contributions in 1916, collaborative work by Ross and Hudson in 1917, the seminal Kermack and McKendrick model in 1927, and Kendall's work in 1956. The historically significant Reed–Frost model, though often overlooked, also substantially influenced modern epidemiological modeling approaches.

Most implementations of compartmental models use ordinary differential equations (ODEs), providing deterministic results that are mathematically tractable. However, they can also be formulated within stochastic frameworks that incorporate randomness, offering more realistic representations of population dynamics at the cost of greater analytical complexity.

Epidemiologists and public health officials use these models for several critical purposes: analyzing disease transmission dynamics, projecting the total number of infections and recoveries over time, estimating key epidemiological parameters such as the basic reproduction number (R_{0}) or effective reproduction number (R_{t}), evaluating potential impacts of different public health interventions before implementation, and informing evidence-based policy decisions during disease outbreaks. Beyond infectious disease modeling, the approach has been adapted for applications in population ecology, pharmacokinetics, chemical kinetics, and other fields requiring the study of transitions between defined states. For such investigations and to consult decision makers, often more complex models are used.

== SIR model ==
The SIR model is one of the simplest compartmental models, and many models are derivatives of this basic form. The model consists of three compartments:

S: The number of susceptible individuals. When a susceptible and an infectious individual come into "infectious contact", the susceptible individual contracts the disease and transitions to the infectious compartment.
I: The number of infectious individuals. These are individuals who have been infected and are capable of infecting susceptible individuals.
R for the number of removed (and immune) or deceased individuals. These are individuals who have been infected and have either recovered from the disease and entered the removed compartment, or died. It is assumed that the number of deaths is negligible with respect to the total population. This compartment may also be called "recovered" or "resistant".

This model is reasonably predictive for infectious diseases that are transmitted from human to human, and where recovery confers lasting resistance, such as measles, mumps, and rubella.

Spatial SIR model simulation. Each cell can infect its eight immediate neighbors.

These variables (S, I, and R) represent the number of people in each compartment at a particular time. To represent that the number of susceptible, infectious, and removed individuals may vary over time (even if the total population size remains constant), we make the precise numbers a function of t (time): S(t), I(t), and R(t). For a specific disease in a specific population, these functions may be worked out in order to predict possible outbreaks and bring them under control. Note that in the SIR model, $R(0)$ and $R_0$ are different quantities – the former describes the number of recovered at t = 0 whereas the latter describes the ratio between the frequency of contacts to the frequency of recovery.

As implied by the variable function of t, the model is dynamic in that the numbers in each compartment may fluctuate over time. The importance of this dynamic aspect is most obvious in an endemic disease with a short infectious period, such as measles in the UK prior to the introduction of a vaccine in 1968. Such diseases tend to occur in cycles of outbreaks due to the variation in number of susceptibles (S(t)) over time. During an epidemic, the number of susceptible individuals falls rapidly as more of them are infected and thus enter the infectious and removed compartments. The disease cannot break out again until the number of susceptibles has built back up, e.g. as a result of offspring being born into the susceptible compartment.

Yellow=Susceptible, Maroon=Infectious, Teal=Recovered

Each member of the population typically progresses from susceptible to infectious to recovered. This can be shown as a flow diagram in which the boxes represent the different compartments and the arrows the transition between compartments (see diagram).

Flow diagram of states in an SIR epidemic model and transition rates between them

=== Transition rates ===
For the full specification of the model, the arrows should be labeled with the transition rates between compartments. Between S and I, the transition rate is assumed to be $d(S/N)/dt = -\beta SI/N^2$, where $N$ is the total population, $\beta$ is the average number of contacts per person per time, multiplied by the probability of disease transmission in a contact between a susceptible and an infectious subject, and $SI/N^2$ is the fraction of all possible contacts that involves an infectious and susceptible individual. (This is mathematically similar to the law of mass action in chemistry in which random collisions between molecules result in a chemical reaction and the fractional rate is proportional to the concentration of the two reactants.)

Between I and R, the transition rate is assumed to be proportional to the number of infectious individuals which is $\gamma I$. If an individual is infectious for an average time period $D$, then $\gamma = 1 / D$. This is also equivalent to the assumption that the length of time spent by an individual in the infectious state is a random variable with an exponential distribution. The "classical" SIR model may be modified by using more complex and realistic distributions for the I-R transition rate (e.g. the Erlang distribution).

For the special case in which there is no removal from the infectious compartment ($\gamma=0$), the SIR model reduces to a very simple SI model, which has a logistic solution, in which every individual eventually becomes infected.

=== The SIR model without birth and death ===
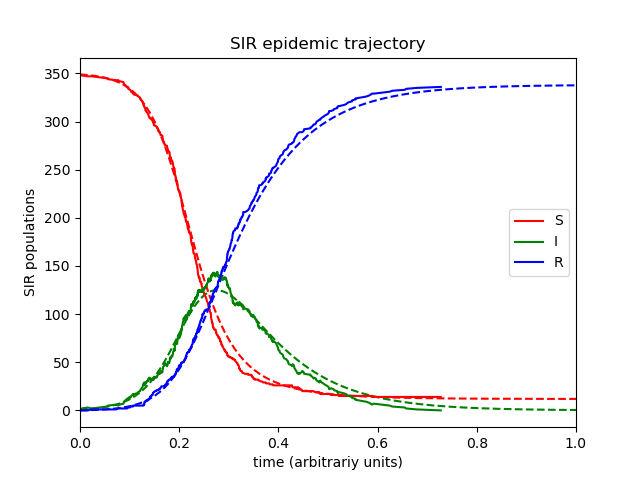
A single realization of the SIR epidemic as produced with an implementation of the Gillespie algorithm and the numerical solution of the ordinary differential equation system (dashed)

The dynamics of an epidemic, for example, the flu, are often much faster than the dynamics of birth and death, therefore, birth and death are often omitted in simple compartmental models. The SIR system without so-called vital dynamics (birth and death, sometimes called demography) described above can be expressed by the following system of ordinary differential equations:

$$\left\{\begin{aligned}
& \frac{dS}{dt} = - \frac{\beta}{N} I S, \\[6pt]
& \frac{dI}{dt} = \frac{\beta}{N} I S - \gamma I, \\[6pt]
& \frac{dR}{dt} = \gamma I,
\end{aligned}\right.$$

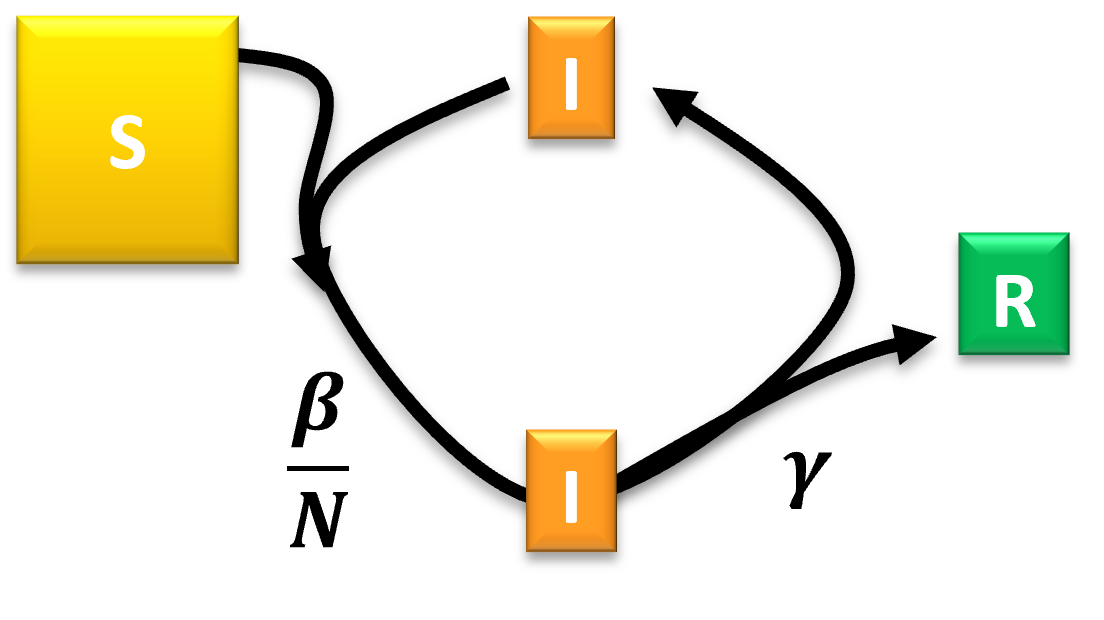
The SIR model

where $S$ is the stock of susceptible population in unit number of people, $I$ is the stock of infected in unit number of people, $R$ is the stock of removed population (either by death or recovery) in unit number of people, and $N$ is the sum of these three in unit number of people. $\beta$ is the infection rate constant in the unit number of people infected per day per infected person, and $\gamma$ is the recovery rate constant in the unit fraction of a person recovered per day per infected person, when time is in unit day.

This model was for the first time proposed by William Ogilvy Kermack and Anderson Gray McKendrick as a special case of what we now call Kermack–McKendrick theory, and followed work McKendrick had done with Ronald Ross.

This system is non-linear, however it is possible to derive its analytic solution in implicit form. Firstly note that from:

$$\frac{dS}{dt} + \frac{dI}{dt} + \frac{dR}{dt}  = 0,$$

it follows that:

$$S(t) + I(t) + R(t) = \text{constant} = N,$$

expressing in mathematical terms the constancy of population $N$. Note that the above relationship implies that one need only study the equation for two of the three variables.

Secondly, we note that the dynamics of the infectious class depends on the following ratio:

$$R_0 = \frac{\beta}{\gamma},$$

the so-called basic reproduction number (also called basic reproduction ratio). This ratio is derived as the expected number of new infections (these new infections are sometimes called secondary infections) from a single infection in a population where all subjects are susceptible. This idea can probably be more readily seen if we say that the typical time between contacts is $T_{c} = \beta^{-1}$, and the typical time until removal is $T_{r} = \gamma^{-1}$. From here it follows that, on average, the number of contacts by an infectious individual with others before the infectious has been removed is: $T_{r}/T_{c}.$

By dividing the first differential equation by the third, separating the variables and integrating we get

$$S(t) = S(0) e^{-R_0(R(t) - R(0))/N},$$

where $S(0)$ and $R(0)$ are the initial numbers of, respectively, susceptible and removed subjects. Writing $s_0 = S(0) / N$ for the initial proportion of susceptible individuals, and $s_\infty = S(\infty) / N$ and $r_\infty = R(\infty) / N$ for the proportion of susceptible and removed individuals respectively in the limit $t \to \infty,$ one has

$$s_\infty = 1 - r_\infty = s_0 e^{-R_0(r_\infty - r_0)}$$

(note that the infectious compartment empties in this limit). This transcendental equation has a solution in terms of the Lambert W function, namely

$$s_\infty = 1-r_\infty = - R_0^{-1}\, W(-s_0 R_0 e^{-R_0(1-r_0)}).$$

This shows that at the end of an epidemic that conforms to the simple assumptions of the SIR model, unless $s_0=0$, not all individuals of the population have been removed, so some must remain susceptible. A driving force leading to the end of an epidemic is a decline in the number of infectious individuals. The epidemic does not typically end because of a complete lack of susceptible individuals.

The role of both the basic reproduction number and the initial susceptibility are extremely important. In fact, upon rewriting the equation for infectious individuals as follows:

$$\frac{dI}{dt} = \left(R_0 \frac{S}{N}  - 1\right) \gamma I,$$

it yields that if:

$$R_{0} \cdot S(0) > N,$$

then:

$$\frac{dI}{dt}(0) >0 ,$$

i.e., there will be a proper epidemic outbreak with an increase of the number of the infectious (which can reach a considerable fraction of the population). On the contrary, if

$$R_{0} \cdot S(0) < N,$$

then

$$\frac{dI}{dt}(0) <0 ,$$

i.e., independently from the initial size of the susceptible population the disease can never cause a proper epidemic outbreak. As a consequence, it is clear that both the basic reproduction number and the initial susceptibility are extremely important.

==== The force of infection ====
Note that in the above model the function:

$$F = \beta I,$$

models the transition rate from the compartment of susceptible individuals to the compartment of infectious individuals, so that it is called the force of infection. However, for large classes of communicable diseases it is more realistic to consider a force of infection that does not depend on the absolute number of infectious subjects, but on their fraction (with respect to the total constant population $N$):

$$F = \beta \frac{I}{N} .$$

Capasso and, afterwards, other authors have proposed nonlinear forces of infection to model more realistically the contagion process.

==== Exact analytical solutions to the SIR model ====
In 2014, Harko and coauthors derived an exact so-called analytical solution (involving an integral that can only be calculated numerically) to the SIR model. In the case without vital dynamics setup, for $\mathcal{S}(u)=S(t)$, etc., it corresponds to the following time parametrization

$$\mathcal{S}(u)= S(0)u$$
$$\mathcal{I}(u)= N -\mathcal{R}(u)-\mathcal{S}(u)$$
$$\mathcal{R}(u)=R(0) -\rho \ln(u)$$

for

$$t= \frac{N}{\beta}\int_u^1 \frac{du^*}{u^*\mathcal{I}(u^*)} , \quad \rho=\frac{\gamma N}{\beta},$$

with initial conditions

$$(\mathcal{S}(1),\mathcal{I}(1),\mathcal{R}(1))=(S(0),N -R(0)-S(0),R(0)), \quad  u_T<u<1,$$

where $u_T$ satisfies $\mathcal{I}(u_T)=0$. By the transcendental equation for $R_{\infty}$ above, it follows that $u_T=e^{-(R_{\infty}-R(0))/\rho}(=S_{\infty}/S(0)$, if $S(0) \neq 0)$ and $I_{\infty}=0$.

An equivalent so-called analytical solution (involving an integral that can only be calculated numerically) found by Miller yields

$$\begin{align}
S(t) & = S(0) e^{-\xi(t)} \\[8pt]
I(t) & = N-S(t)-R(t) \\[8pt]
R(t) & = R(0) + \rho \xi(t) \\[8pt]
\xi(t) & = \frac{\beta}{N}\int_0^t I(t^*) \, dt^*
\end{align}$$

Here $\xi(t)$ can be interpreted as the expected number of transmissions an individual has received by time $t$. The two solutions are related by $e^{-\xi(t)} = u$.

Effectively the same result can be found in the original work by Kermack and McKendrick.

These solutions may be easily understood by noting that all of the terms on the right-hand sides of the original differential equations are proportional to $I$. The equations may thus be divided through by $I$, and the time rescaled so that the differential operator on the left-hand side becomes simply $d/d\tau$, where $d\tau=I dt$, i.e. $\tau=\int I dt$. The differential equations are now all linear, and the third equation, of the form $dR/d\tau =$ const., shows that $\tau$ and $R$ (and $\xi$ above) are simply linearly related.

A highly accurate analytic approximant of the SIR model as well as exact analytic expressions for the final values $S_{\infty}$, $I_{\infty}$, and $R_{\infty}$ were provided by Kröger and Schlickeiser, so that there is no need to perform a numerical integration to solve the SIR model (a simplified example practice on COVID-19 numerical simulation using Microsoft Excel can be found here), to obtain its parameters from existing data, or to predict the future dynamics of an epidemics modeled by the SIR model. The approximant involves the Lambert W function which is part of all basic data visualization software such as Microsoft Excel, MATLAB, and Mathematica.

While Kendall considered the so-called all-time SIR model where the initial conditions $S(0)$, $I(0)$, and $R(0)$ are coupled through the above relations, Kermack and McKendrick proposed to study the more general semi-time case, for which $S(0)$ and $I(0)$ are both arbitrary. This latter version, denoted as semi-time SIR model, makes predictions only for future times $t>0$. An analytic approximant and exact expressions for the final values are available for the semi-time SIR model as well.

==== Numerical solutions to the SIR model with approximations ====
Numerical solutions to the SIR model can be found in the literature. An example is using the model to analyze COVID-19 spreading data. Three reproduction numbers can be pulled out from the data analyzed with numerical approximation,

the basic reproduction number:

$$R_0=\frac{\beta_0}{\gamma_0}$$

the real-time reproduction number:

$$R_t=\frac{\beta_t}{\gamma_t}$$

and the real-time effective reproduction number:

$$R_e=\frac{\beta_tS}{\gamma_tN}$$

$R_0$ represents the speed of reproduction rate at the beginning of the spreading when all populations are assumed susceptible, e.g. if $\beta_0 = 0.4 day^{-1}$ and $\gamma_0 = 0.2 day^{-1}$ meaning one infectious person on average infects 0.4 susceptible people per day and recovers in 1/0.2=5 days. Thus when this person recovered, there are two people still infectious directly got from this person and $R_0 = 2$, i.e. the number of infectious people doubled in one cycle of 5 days. The data simulated by the model with $R_0 = 2$ or real data fitted will yield a doubling of the number of infectious people faster than 5 days because the two infected people are infecting people. From the SIR model, we can tell that $\beta$ is determined by the nature of the disease and also a function of the interactive frequency between the infectious person $I$ with the susceptible people $S$ and also the intensity/duration of the interaction like how close they interact for how long and whether or not they both wear masks, thus, it changes over time when the average behavior of the carriers and susceptible people changes. The model use $SI$ to represent these factors but it indeed is referenced to the initial stage when no action is taken to prevent the spread and all population is susceptible, thus all changes are absorbed by the change of $\beta$.

$\gamma$ is usually more stable over time assuming when the infectious person shows symptoms, she/he will seek medical attention or be self-isolated. So if we find $R_t$ changes, most probably the behaviors of people in the community have changed from their normal patterns before the outbreak, or the disease has mutated to a new form. Costive massive detection and isolation of susceptible close contacts have effects on reducing $1/\gamma$ but whose efficiencies are under debate. This debate is largely on the uncertainty of the number of days reduced from after infectious or detectable whichever comes first to before a symptom shows up for an infected susceptible person. If the person is infectious after symptoms show up, or detection only works for a person with symptoms, then these prevention methods are not necessary, and self-isolation and/or medical attention is the best way to cut the $1/\gamma$ values. The typical onset of the COVID-19 infectious period is in the order of one day from the symptoms showing up, making massive detection with typical frequency in a few days useless.

$R_t$ does not tell us whether or not the spreading will speed up or slow down in the latter stages when the fraction of susceptible people in the community has dropped significantly after recovery or vaccination. $R_e$ corrects this dilution effect by multiplying the fraction of the susceptible population over the total population. It corrects the effective/transmissible interaction between an infectious person and the rest of the community when many of the interaction is immune in the middle to late stages of the disease spreading. Thus, when $R_e > 1$, we will see an exponential-like outbreak; when $R_e = 1$, a steady state reached and no number of infectious people changes over time; and when $R_e < 1$, the disease decays and fades away over time.

Using the differential equations of the SIR model and converting them to numerical discrete forms, one can set up the recursive equations and calculate the S, I, and R populations with any given initial conditions but accumulate errors over a long calculation time from the reference point. Sometimes a convergence test is needed to estimate the errors. Given a set of initial conditions and the disease-spreading data, one can also fit the data with the SIR model and pull out the three reproduction numbers when the errors are usually negligible due to the short time step from the reference point. Any point of the time can be used as the initial condition to predict the future after it using this numerical model with assumption of time-evolved parameters such as population, $R_t$, and $\gamma$. However, away from this reference point, errors will accumulate over time thus convergence test is needed to find an optimal time step for more accurate results.

Among these three reproduction numbers, $R_0$ is very useful to judge the control pressure, e.g., a large value meaning the disease will spread very fast and is very difficult to control. $R_t$ is most useful in predicting future trends, for example, if we know the social interactions have reduced 50% frequently from that before the outbreak and the interaction intensities among people are the same, then we can set $R_t = 0.5R_0$. If social distancing and masks add another 50% cut in infection efficiency, we can set $R_t = 0.25R_0$. $R_e$ will perfectly correlate with the waves of the spreading and whenever $R_e>1$, the spreading accelerates, and when $R_e<1$, the spreading slows down thus useful to set a prediction on the short-term trends. Also, it can be used to directly calculate the threshold population of vaccination/immunization for the herd immunity stage by setting $R_t = R_0$, and $R_E = 1$, i.e. $S = N/R_0$.

=== The SIR model with vital dynamics and constant population ===
Consider a population characterized by a death rate $\mu$ and birth rate $\Lambda$, and where a communicable disease is spreading. The model with mass-action transmission is:

$$\begin{align}
\frac{dS}{dt} & = \Lambda - \mu S - \frac{\beta I S}{N} \\[8pt]
\frac{dI}{dt} & = \frac{\beta I S}{N} - \gamma I -\mu I \\[8pt]
\frac{dR}{dt} & = \gamma I  - \mu R
\end{align}$$

for which the disease-free equilibrium (DFE) is:

$$\left(S(t),I(t),R(t)\right) =\left(\frac{\Lambda}{\mu},0,0\right).$$

In this case, we can derive a basic reproduction number:

$$R_0 = \frac{ \beta}{\mu+\gamma},$$

which has threshold properties. In fact, independently from biologically meaningful initial values, one can show that:

$$R_0 \le 1 \Rightarrow  \lim_{t \to \infty} (S(t),I(t),R(t)) = \textrm{DFE} = \left(\frac{\Lambda}{\mu},0,0\right)$$
$$R_0 > 1 , I(0)> 0 \Rightarrow  \lim_{t \to \infty} (S(t),I(t),R(t)) = \textrm{EE} = \left(\frac{\gamma+\mu}{\beta},\frac{\mu}{\beta}\left(R_0-1\right), \frac{\gamma}{\beta} \left(R_0-1\right)\right).$$

The point EE is called the Endemic Equilibrium (the disease is not totally eradicated and remains in the population). With heuristic arguments, one may show that $R_{0}$ may be read as the average number of infections caused by a single infectious subject in a wholly susceptible population, the above relationship biologically means that if this number is less than or equal to one the disease goes extinct, whereas if this number is greater than one the disease will remain permanently endemic in the population.

=== The SIR model ===
Diagram of the SIR model with initial values $S(0)=997, I(0)=3, R(0)=0$, and rates for infection $\beta=0.4$ and for recovery $\gamma=0.04$

Animation of the SIR model with initial values $S(0)=997, I(0)=3, R(0)=0$, and rate of recovery $\gamma=0.04$. The animation shows the effect of reducing the rate of infection from $\beta=0.5$ to $\beta=0.12$. If there is no medicine or vaccination available, it is only possible to reduce the infection rate (often referred to as "flattening the curve") by appropriate measures such as social distancing.

In 1927, W. O. Kermack and A. G. McKendrick created a model in which they considered a fixed population with only three compartments: susceptible, $S(t)$; infected, $I(t)$; and recovered, $R(t)$. The compartments used for this model consist of three classes:

- $S(t)$ is used to represent the individuals not yet infected with the disease at time t, or those susceptible to the disease of the population.
- $I(t)$ denotes the individuals of the population who have been infected with the disease and are capable of spreading the disease to those in the susceptible category.
- $R(t)$ is the compartment used for the individuals of the population who have been infected and then removed from the disease, either due to immunization or due to death. Those in this category are not able to be infected again or to transmit the infection to others.

The flow of this model may be considered as follows:

$${\color{blue}{\mathcal{S} \rightarrow \mathcal{I} \rightarrow \mathcal{R}}}$$

Using a fixed population, $N = S(t) + I(t) + R(t)$ in the three functions resolves that the value $N$ should remain constant within the simulation, if a simulation is used to solve the SIR model. Alternatively, the analytic approximant can be used without performing a simulation. The model is started with values of $S(t=0)$, $I(t=0)$ and $R(t=0)$. These are the number of people in the susceptible, infected and removed categories at time equals zero. If the SIR model is assumed to hold at all times, these initial conditions are not independent. Subsequently, the flow model updates the three variables for every time point with set values for $\beta$ and $\gamma$. The simulation first updates the infected from the susceptible and then the removed category is updated from the infected category for the next time point (t=1). This describes the flow persons between the three categories. During an epidemic the susceptible category is not shifted with this model, $\beta$ changes over the course of the epidemic and so does $\gamma$. These variables determine the length of the epidemic and would have to be updated with each cycle.

$$\frac{dS}{dt} = - \beta S I$$

$$\frac{dI}{dt} = \beta S I - \gamma I$$

$$\frac{dR}{dt} = \gamma I$$

Several assumptions were made in the formulation of these equations: First, an individual in the population must be considered as having an equal probability as every other individual of contracting the disease with a rate of $a$ and an equal fraction $b$ of people that an individual makes contact with per unit time. Then, let $\beta$ be the multiplication of $a$ and $b$. This is the transmission probability times the contact rate. Besides, an infected individual makes contact with $b$ persons per unit time whereas only a fraction, $S/N$ of them are susceptible. Thus, we have every infective can infect $a b S = \beta S$ susceptible persons, and therefore, the whole number of susceptibles infected by infectives per unit time is $\beta S I$. For the second and third equations, consider the population leaving the susceptible class as equal to the number entering the infected class. However, a number equal to the fraction $\gamma$ (which represents the mean recovery/death rate, or $1/\gamma$ the mean infective period) of infectives are leaving this class per unit time to enter the removed class. These processes which occur simultaneously are referred to as the Law of Mass Action, a widely accepted idea that the rate of contact between two groups in a population is proportional to the size of each of the groups concerned. Finally, it is assumed that the rate of infection and recovery is much faster than the time scale of births and deaths and therefore, these factors are ignored in this model.

=== Steady-state solutions ===
The only steady state solution to the classic SIR model as defined by the differential equations above is I=0, S and R can then take any values. The model can be changed while retaining three compartments to give a steady-state endemic solution by adding some input to the S compartment.

For example, one may postulate that the expected duration of susceptibility will be $\operatorname E[\min(T_L\mid T_S)]$ where $T_L$ reflects the time alive (life expectancy) and $T_S$ reflects the time in the susceptible state before becoming infected, which can be simplified to:

$$\operatorname E[\min(T_L\mid T_S)]=\int_0^\infty e^{-(\mu+\delta) x} \, dx= \frac{1}{\mu+\delta},$$

such that the number of susceptible persons is the number entering the susceptible compartment $\mu N$ times the duration of susceptibility:

$$S = \frac{\mu N}{\mu + \lambda}.$$

Analogously, the steady-state number of infected persons is the number entering the infected state from the susceptible state (number susceptible, times rate of infection) $\lambda = \tfrac{\beta I}{N},$ times the duration of infectiousness $\tfrac{1}{\mu+v}$:

$$I = \frac{\mu N}{\mu + \lambda} \lambda \frac{1}{\mu + v}.$$

=== Other compartmental models ===
There are many modifications of the SIR model, including those that include births and deaths, where upon recovery there is no immunity (SIS model), where immunity lasts only for a short period of time (SIRS), where there is a latent period of the disease where the person is not infectious (SEIS and SEIR), and where infants can be born with immunity (MSIR). Also, compartments for vaccination, detection, or infected vectors like fleas, ticks, or mosquitoes can be added. Compartmental models can also be used to model multiple risk groups, and even the interaction of multiple pathogens.

== Variations on the basic SIR model ==
=== SIS model ===
Yellow=Susceptible, Maroon=Infected

Some infections, for example, those from the common cold and influenza, do not confer any long-lasting immunity. Such infections may give temporary resistance but do not give long-term immunity upon recovery from infection, and individuals become susceptible again.

SIS compartmental model

We have the model:

$$\begin{align}
\frac{dS}{dt} & = - \frac{\beta S I}{N} + \gamma I \\[6pt]
\frac{dI}{dt} & = \frac{\beta S I}{N} - \gamma I
\end{align}$$

Note that denoting with N the total population it holds that:

$$\frac{dS}{dt} + \frac{dI}{dt} = 0 \Rightarrow S(t)+I(t) = N$$.

It follows that:

$$\frac{dI}{dt} = (\beta - \gamma)  I - \frac{\beta}{N} I^2$$,

i.e. the dynamics of infectious is ruled by a logistic function, so that $\forall I(0) > 0$:

$$\begin{align}
& \frac{\beta}{\gamma} \le 1 \Rightarrow \lim_{t \to +\infty}I(t)=0, \\[6pt]
& \frac{\beta}{\gamma} > 1 \Rightarrow \lim_{t \to +\infty}I(t) = \left(1 - \frac{\gamma}{\beta} \right) N.
\end{align}$$

It is possible to find an analytical solution to this model (by making a transformation of variables: $I = y^{-1}$ and substituting this into the mean-field equations), such that the basic reproduction rate is greater than unity. The solution is given as

$$I(t) = \frac{I_\infty}{1+V e^{-\chi t}}$$.

where $I_\infty = (1 -\gamma/\beta)N$ is the endemic infectious population, $\chi = \beta-\gamma$, and $V = I_\infty/I_0 - 1$. As the system is assumed to be closed, the susceptible population is then $S(t) = N - I(t)$.

Whenever the integer nature of the number of agents is evident (populations with fewer than tens of thousands of individuals), inherent fluctuations in the disease spreading process caused by discrete agents result in uncertainties. In this scenario, the evolution of the disease predicted by compartmental equations deviates significantly from the observed results. These uncertainties may even cause the epidemic to end earlier than predicted by the compartmental equations.

As a special case, one obtains the usual logistic function by assuming $\gamma=0$. This can be also considered in the SIR model with $R=0$, i.e. no removal will take place. That is the SI model. The differential equation system using $S=N-I$ thus reduces to:

$$\frac{dI}{dt}  \propto  I\cdot (N-I).$$

In the long run, in the SI model, all individuals will become infected.

=== SIRD model ===
Diagram of the SIRD model with initial values $S(0)=997, I(0)=3, R(0)=0$ and the rates of infection $\beta=0.4$, recovery $\gamma=0.035$ and mortality $\mu=0.005$

Animation of the SIRD model with initial values $S(0)=997, I(0)=3, R(0)=0$, and rates of recovery $\gamma=0.035$ and mortality $\mu=0.005$. The animation shows the effect of reducing the rate of infection from $\beta=0.5$ to $\beta=0.12$. If there is no medicine or vaccination available, it is only possible to reduce the infection rate (often referred to as "flattening the curve") by measures such as "social distancing".

The Susceptible-Infectious-Recovered-Deceased model differentiates between Recovered (meaning specifically individuals having survived the disease and now immune) and Deceased. The SIRD model has semi analytical solutions based on the four parts method. This model uses the following system of differential equations:

$$\begin{align}
& \frac{dS}{dt} = - \frac{\beta I S}{N}, \\[6pt]
& \frac{dI}{dt} = \frac{\beta I S}{N} - \gamma I - \mu I, \\[6pt]
& \frac{dR}{dt} = \gamma I, \\[6pt]
& \frac{dD}{dt} = \mu I,
\end{align}$$

where $\beta, \gamma, \mu$ are the rates of infection, recovery, and mortality, respectively.

=== SIRV model ===
The Susceptible-Infectious-Recovered-Vaccinated model is an extended SIR model that accounts for vaccination of the susceptible population. This model uses the following system of differential equations:

$$\begin{align}
& \frac{dS}{dt} = - \frac{\beta(t) I S}{N} - v(t) S, \\[6pt]
& \frac{dI}{dt} = \frac{\beta(t) I S}{N} - \gamma(t) I, \\[6pt]
& \frac{dR}{dt} = \gamma(t) I, \\[6pt]
& \frac{dV}{dt} = v(t) S,
\end{align}$$

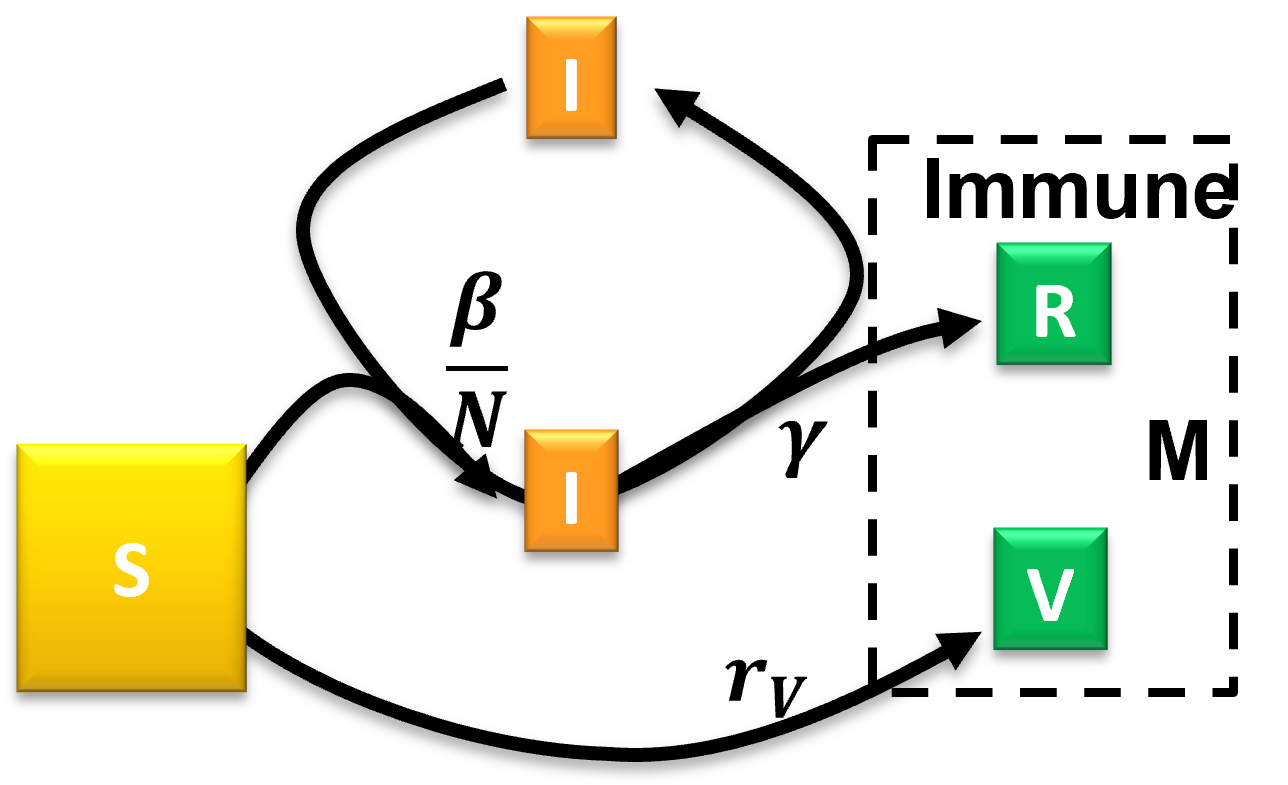
A cartoon for the SIRV model

where $\beta, \gamma, v$ are the rates of infection, recovery, and vaccination, respectively. For the semi-time initial conditions $S(0)=(1-\eta)N$, $I(0)=\eta N$, $R(0)=V(0)=0$ and constant ratios $k=\gamma(t)/\beta(t)$ and $b=v(t)/\beta(t)$ the model had been solved approximately. The occurrence of a pandemic outburst requires $k+b<1-2\eta$ and there is a critical reduced vaccination rate $b_c$ beyond which the steady-state size $S_\infty$of the susceptible compartment remains relatively close to $S(0)$. Arbitrary initial conditions satisfying $S(0)+I(0)+R(0)+V(0)=N$ can be mapped to the solved special case with $R(0)=V(0)=0$.

The numerical solution of this model to calculate the real-time reproduction number $R_t$ of COVID-19 can be practiced based on information from the different populations in a community. Numerical solution is a commonly used method to analyze complicated kinetic networks when the analytical solution is difficult to obtain or limited by requirements such as boundary conditions or special parameters. It uses recursive equations to calculate the next step by converting the numerical integration into Riemann sum of discrete time steps e.g., use yesterday's principal and interest rate to calculate today's interest which assumes the interest rate is fixed during the day. The calculation contains projected errors if the analytical corrections on the numerical step size are not included, e.g. when the interest rate of annual collection is simplified to 12 times the monthly rate, a projected error is introduced. Thus the calculated results will carry accumulative errors when the time step is far away from the reference point and a convergence test is needed to estimate the error. However, this error is usually acceptable for data fitting. When fitting a set of data with a close time step, the error is relatively small because the reference point is nearby compared to when predicting a long period of time after a reference point. Once the real-time $R_t$ is pulled out, one can compare it to the basic reproduction number $R_0$. Before the vaccination, $R_t$ gives the policy maker and general public a measure of the efficiency of social mitigation activities such as social distancing and face masking simply by dividing $\frac{R_t}{R_0}$. Under massive vaccination, the goal of disease control is to reduce the effective reproduction number $R_e = \frac{R_tS}{N} < 1$, where $S$ is the number of susceptible population at the time and $N$ is the total population. When $R_e < 1$, the spreading decays and daily infected cases go down.

=== SIRVD model ===
The susceptible-infected-recovered-vaccinated-deceased (SIRVD) epidemic compartment model extends the SIR model to include the effects of vaccination campaigns and time-dependent fatality rates on epidemic outbreaks. It encompasses the SIR, SIRV, SIRD, and SI models as special cases, with individual time-dependent rates governing transitions between different fractions. This model uses the following system of differential equations for the population fractions $S, I, R, V, D$:

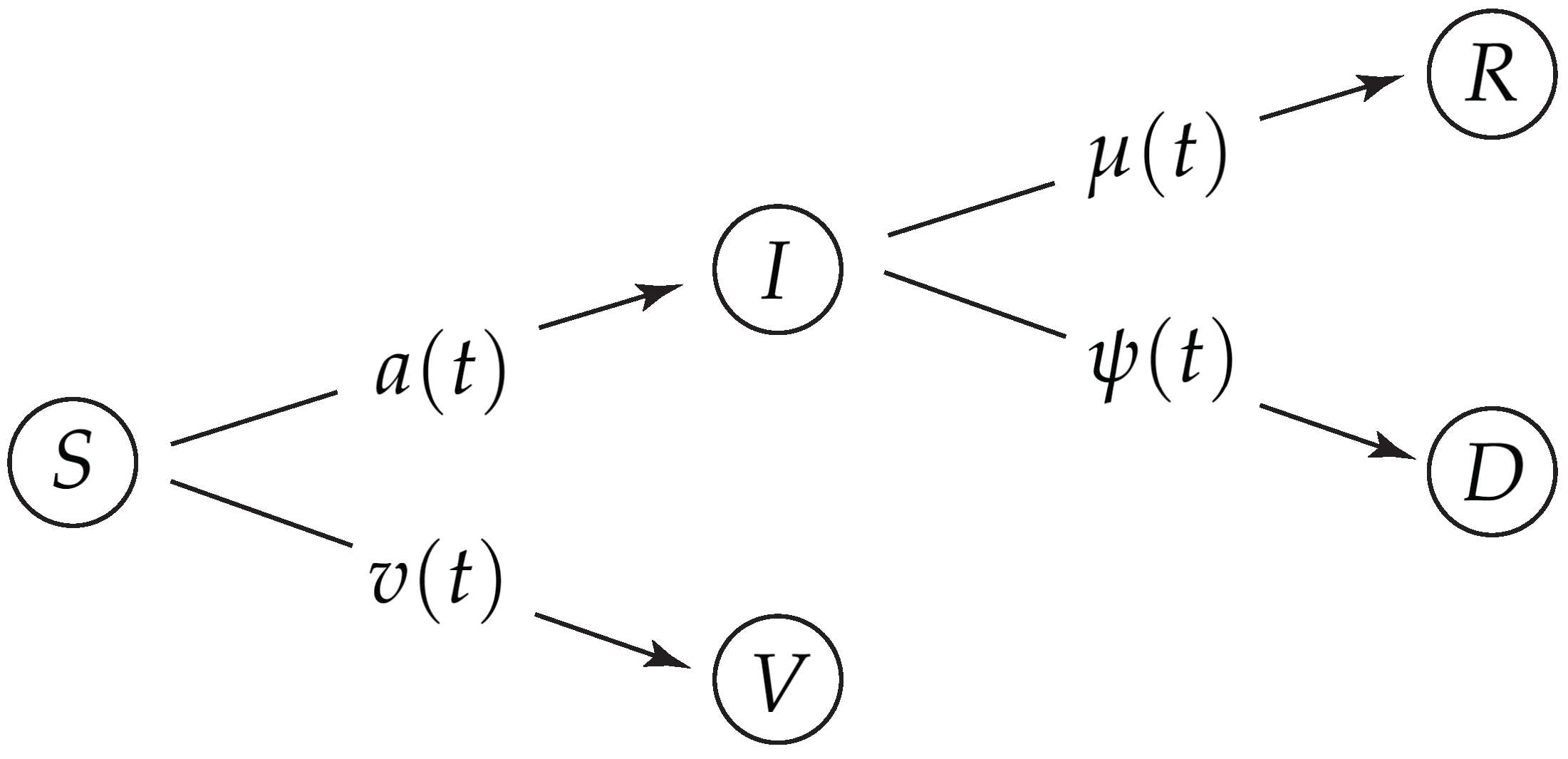
This file provides a cartoon of the SIRVD model

$$\begin{align}
& \frac{dS}{dt} = - a(t) S I - v(t) S, \\[6pt]
& \frac{dI}{dt} = a(t) S I - \mu(t) I - \psi(t) I, \\[6pt]
& \frac{dR}{dt} = \mu(t) I, \\[6pt]
& \frac{dV}{dt} = v(t) S,\\[6pt]
& \frac{dD}{dt} = \psi(t) I
\end{align}$$

where $a(t), v(t), \mu(t), \psi(t)$ are the infection, vaccination, recovery, and fatality rates, respectively. For the semi-time initial conditions $S(0)=1-\eta$, $I(0)=\eta$, $R(0)=V(0)=D(0)=0$ and constant ratios $k=\mu(t)/a(t)$, $b=v(t)/a(t)$, and $q=\psi(t)/a(t)$ the model had been solved approximately, and exactly for some special cases, irrespective of the functional form of $a(t)$. This is achieved upon rewriting the above SIRVD model equations in equivalent, but reduced form

$$\begin{align}
& \frac{dS}{d\tau} = - S I - b(\tau) S, \\[6pt]
& \frac{dI}{d\tau} = S I - [k(\tau)+q(\tau)] I, \\[6pt]
& \frac{dR}{d\tau} = k(\tau) I, \\[6pt]
& \frac{dV}{d\tau} = b(\tau) S,\\[6pt]
& \frac{dD}{d\tau} = q(\tau) S
\end{align}$$

where

$$\tau(t) = \int_0^t a(\xi) d\xi$$

is a reduced, dimensionless time. The temporal dependence of the infected fraction $I(\tau)$ and the rate of new infections $j(\tau)=S(\tau)I(\tau)$ differs when considering the effects of vaccinations and when the real-time dependence of fatality and recovery rates diverge. These differences have been highlighted for stationary ratios and gradually decreasing fatality rates. The case of stationary ratios allows one to construct a diagnostics method to extract analytically all SIRVD model parameters from measured COVID-19 data of a completed pandemic wave.

=== SIRVB model ===
The SIRVB model adds a breakthrough pathway in the SIRV model.

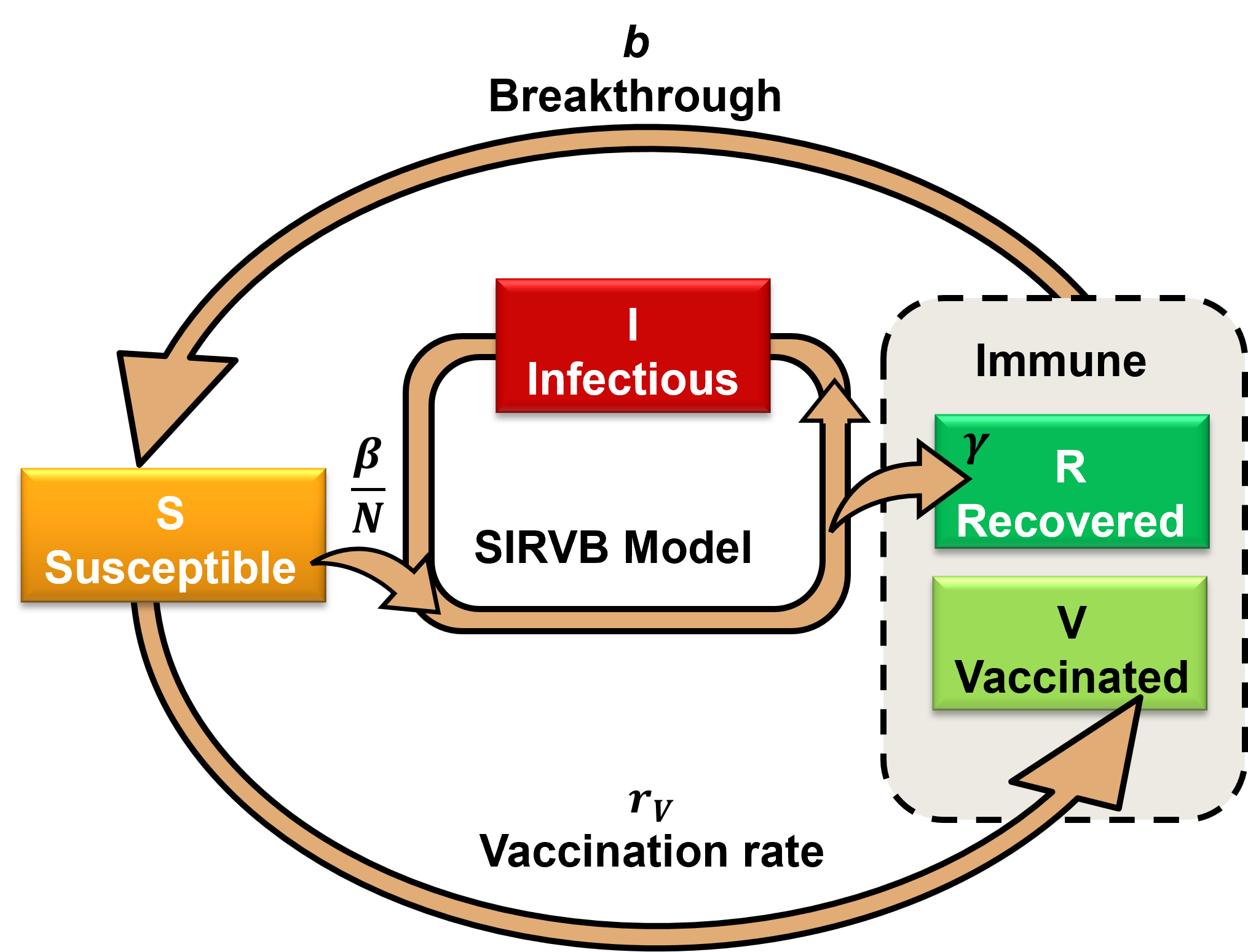
Scheme of SIRVB model

The kinetic equations become:

$$\begin{align}
& \frac{dS}{dt} = - a(t) S I - v(t) S + b(t)
[\mu(t) I + v(t) S ], \\[6pt]
& \frac{dI}{dt} = a(t) S I - \mu(t) I, \\[6pt]
& \frac{dR}{dt} = [1- b(t)] \mu(t) I , \\[6pt]
& \frac{dV}{dt} = [1- b(t)] v(t) S ,\\[6pt]
\end{align}$$

where infection rate $a(t)$ can be write as $\beta(t) /N$, recovery rate $\mu(t)$ can be simplified to a constant $\gamma$, $v(t)$ is the vaccination rate, $b(t)$ is the break through ratio or fraction of immuned people susceptible to reinfection (<1).

=== MSIR model ===
For many infections, including measles, babies are not born into the susceptible compartment but are immune to the disease for the first few months of life due to protection from maternal antibodies (passed across the placenta and additionally through colostrum). This is called passive immunity. This added detail can be shown by including an M class (for maternally derived immunity) at the beginning of the model.

MSIR compartmental model

To indicate this mathematically, an additional compartment is added, M(t). This results in the following differential equations:

$$\begin{align}
\frac{dM}{dt} & = \Lambda - \delta M - \mu M\\[8pt]
\frac{dS}{dt} & = \delta M - \frac{\beta SI}{N} - \mu S\\[8pt]
\frac{dI}{dt} & = \frac{\beta SI}{N} - \gamma I - \mu I\\[8pt]
\frac{dR}{dt} & = \gamma I - \mu R
\end{align}$$

=== Carrier state ===
Some people who have had an infectious disease such as tuberculosis never completely recover and continue to carry the infection, whilst not suffering the disease themselves. They may then move back into the infectious compartment and suffer symptoms (as in tuberculosis) or they may continue to infect others in their carrier state, while not suffering symptoms. The most famous example of this is probably Mary Mallon, who infected 22 people with typhoid fever. The carrier compartment is labelled C.

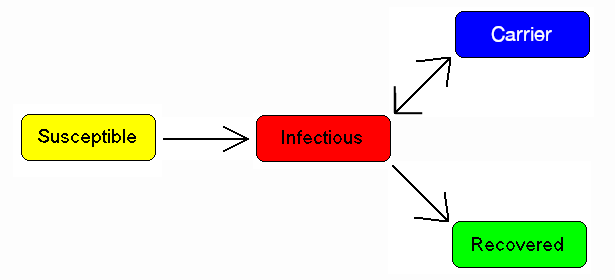

=== SEIR model ===
For many important infections, there is a significant latency period during which individuals have been infected but are not yet infectious themselves. During this period the individual is in compartment E (for exposed).

SEIR compartmental model

Assuming that the latency period is a random variable with exponential distribution with parameter $a$ (i.e. the average latency period is $a^{-1}$), and also assuming the presence of vital dynamics with birth rate $\Lambda$ equal to death rate $N\mu$ (so that the total number $N$ is constant), we have the model:

$$\begin{align}
\frac{dS}{dt} & = \mu N - \mu S - \frac{\beta I S}{N} \\[8pt]
\frac{dE}{dt} & = \frac{\beta I S}{N} - (\mu + a ) E \\[8pt]
\frac{dI}{dt} & = a E - (\gamma +\mu ) I \\[8pt]
\frac{dR}{dt} & = \gamma I - \mu R.
\end{align}$$

We have $S+E+I+R=N,$ but this is only constant because of the simplifying assumption that birth and death rates are equal; in general $N$ is a variable.

For this model, the basic reproduction number is:

$$R_0 = \frac{a}{\mu+a}\frac{\beta}{\mu+\gamma}.$$

Similarly to the SIR model, also, in this case, we have a Disease-Free-Equilibrium (N,0,0,0) and an Endemic Equilibrium EE, and one can show that, independently from biologically meaningful initial conditions

$$\left(S(0),E(0),I(0),R(0)\right) \in \left\{(S,E,I,R)\in [0,N]^4 : S \ge 0, E \ge 0, I\ge 0, R\ge 0, S+E+I+R = N \right\}$$

it holds that:

$$R_0 \le 1 \Rightarrow \lim_{t \to +\infty} \left(S(t),E(t),I(t),R(t)\right) = DFE = (N,0,0,0),$$
$$R_0 > 1 , I(0)> 0 \Rightarrow \lim_{t \to +\infty} \left(S(t),E(t),I(t),R(t)\right) = EE.$$

In case of periodically varying contact rate $\beta(t)$ the condition for the global attractiveness of DFE is that the following linear system with periodic coefficients:

$$\begin{align}
\frac{dE_1}{dt} & = \beta(t) I_1 - (\gamma +a ) E_1 \\[8pt]
\frac{dI_1}{dt} & = a E_1 - (\gamma +\mu ) I_1
\end{align}$$

is stable (i.e. it has its Floquet's eigenvalues inside the unit circle in the complex plane).

=== SEIS model ===
The SEIS model is like the SEIR model (above) except that no immunity is acquired at the end.

$${\color{blue}{\mathcal{S} \to \mathcal{E} \to \mathcal{I} \to \mathcal{S}}}$$

In this model an infection does not leave any immunity thus individuals that have recovered return to being susceptible, moving back into the S(t) compartment. The following differential equations describe this model:

$$\begin{align}
\frac{dS}{dt} & = \Lambda - \frac{\beta SI}{N} - \mu S + \gamma I \\[6pt]
\frac{dE}{dt} & = \frac{\beta SI}{N} - (\epsilon + \mu)E \\[6pt]
\frac{dI}{dt} & = \epsilon E - (\gamma + \mu)I
\end{align}$$

=== MSEIR model ===
For the case of a disease, with the factors of passive immunity, and a latency period there is the MSEIR model.

$$\color{blue}{\mathcal{M} \to \mathcal{S} \to \mathcal{E} \to \mathcal{I} \to \mathcal{R}}$$

$$\begin{align}
\frac{dM}{dt} & = \Lambda - \delta M - \mu M \\[6pt]
\frac{dS}{dt} & = \delta M - \frac{\beta SI}{N} - \mu S \\[6pt]
\frac{dE}{dt} & = \frac{\beta SI}{N} - (\varepsilon + \mu)E \\[6pt]
\frac{dI}{dt} & = \varepsilon E - (\gamma + \mu)I \\[6pt]
\frac{dR}{dt} & = \gamma I - \mu R
\end{align}$$

=== MSEIRS model ===
An MSEIRS model is similar to the MSEIR, but the immunity in the R class would be temporary, so that individuals would regain their susceptibility when the temporary immunity ended.

$${\color{blue}{\mathcal{M} \to \mathcal{S} \to \mathcal{E} \to \mathcal{I} \to \mathcal{R} \to \mathcal{S}}}$$

=== More complex general models ===
When developing more detailed models for in-depth analysis, models are mostly generated for specific outbreak scenarios of specific diseases, including compartments for targeted research questions like hospitalization compartments or detection dynamics. Even though those models are often tailored for specific situations, there are complex models, still usable for a broad variety of different diseases. One of those attempts to create a general model includes twelve compartments, extending the well-known SEIR model by a second stage of infection, detection compartments, and two doses of vaccination. Additionally smear infections are incorporated via an external Pathogen $P$ and a simplistic vector population is included by $S_V$ and $I_V$. Moreover population dynamics like birth and death processes can be included. Such complex models enable a deeper understanding of infection dynamics and the introduction of different pharmaceutical and non-pharmaceutical interventions.

=== Variable contact rates ===
It is well known that the probability of getting a disease is not constant in time. As a pandemic progresses, reactions to the pandemic may change the contact rates which are assumed constant in the simpler models. Counter-measures such as masks, social distancing, and lockdown will alter the contact rate in a way to reduce the speed of the pandemic.

In addition, Some diseases are seasonal, such as the common cold viruses, which are more prevalent during winter. With childhood diseases, such as measles, mumps, and rubella, there is a strong correlation with the school calendar, so that during the school holidays the probability of getting such a disease dramatically decreases. As a consequence, for many classes of diseases, one should consider a force of infection with periodically ('seasonal') varying contact rate

$$F = \beta(t) \frac{I}{N} , \quad \beta(t+T)=\beta(t)$$

with period T equal to one year.

Thus, our model becomes

$$\begin{align}
\frac{dS}{dt} & = \mu N - \mu S - \beta(t) \frac{I}{N} S \\[8pt]
\frac{dI}{dt} & = \beta(t) \frac{I}{N} S - (\gamma +\mu ) I
\end{align}$$

(the dynamics of recovered easily follows from $R=N-S-I$), i.e. a nonlinear set of differential equations with periodically varying parameters. It is well known that this class of dynamical systems may undergo very interesting and complex phenomena of nonlinear parametric resonance. It is easy to see that if:

$$\frac 1 T \int_0^T \frac{\beta(t)}{\mu+\gamma} \, dt < 1 \Rightarrow \lim_{t \to +\infty} (S(t),I(t)) = DFE = (N,0),$$

whereas if the integral is greater than one the disease will not die out and there may be such resonances. For example, considering the periodically varying contact rate as the 'input' of the system one has that the output is a periodic function whose period is a multiple of the period of the input. This allowed to give a contribution to explain the poly-annual (typically biennial) epidemic outbreaks of some infectious diseases as interplay between the period of the contact rate oscillations and the pseudo-period of the damped oscillations near the endemic equilibrium. Remarkably, in some cases, the behavior may also be quasi-periodic or even chaotic.

=== SIR model with diffusion ===
Spatiotemporal compartmental models describe not the total number, but the density of susceptible/infective/recovered persons. Consequently, they also allow to model the distribution of infected persons in space. In most cases, this is done by combining the SIR model with a diffusion equation

$$\begin{align}
& \partial_t S =  D_S \nabla^2 S - \frac{\beta I S}{N}, \\[6pt]
& \partial_t I = D_I \nabla^2 I + \frac{\beta I S}{N}- \gamma I, \\[6pt]
& \partial_t R =  D_R \nabla^2 R + \gamma I,
\end{align}$$

where $D_S$, $D_I$ and $D_R$ are diffusion constants. Thereby, one obtains a reaction-diffusion equation. (Note that, for dimensional reasons, the parameter $\beta$ has to be changed compared to the simple SIR model.) Early models of this type have been used to model the spread of the black death in Europe. Extensions of this model have been used to incorporate, e.g., effects of nonpharmaceutical interventions such as social distancing.

=== Interacting Subpopulation SEIR Model ===
As social contacts, disease severity and lethality, as well as the efficacy of prophylactic measures may differ substantially between interacting subpopulations, e.g., the elderly versus the young, separate SEIR models for each subgroup may be used that are mutually connected through interaction links. Such Interacting Subpopulation SEIR models have been used for modeling the COVID-19 pandemic at continent scale to develop personalized, accelerated, subpopulation-targeted vaccination strategies that promise a shortening of the pandemic and a reduction of case and death counts in the setting of limited access to vaccines during a wave of virus Variants of Concern.

=== SIR Model on Networks ===
The SIR model has been studied on networks of various kinds in order to model a more realistic form of connection than the homogeneous mixing condition which is usually required. A simple model for epidemics on networks in which an individual has a probability p of being infected by each of his infected neighbors in a given time step leads to results similar to giant component formation on Erdos Renyi random graphs. A stochastic compartment model with a transmission pathway via vectors has been developed recently in which a multiple random walkers approach is implemented to investigate the spreading dynamics in random graphs of the Watts-Strogatz and the Barabási-Albert type to mimic human mobility patterns in complex real world environments such as cities, streets, and transportation networks. This model captures the class of vector transmitted infectious diseases such as Dengue, Malaria (transmission by mosquitoes), pestilence (transmission by fleas), and others.

=== SIR_{SS} model - combination of SIR with modelling of social stress ===
Dynamics of epidemics depend on how people's behavior changes in time. For example, at the beginning of the epidemic, people are ignorant and careless, then, after the outbreak of epidemics and alarm, they begin to comply with the various restrictions and the spreading of epidemics may decline. Over time, some people get tired/frustrated by the restrictions and stop following them (exhaustion), especially if the number of new cases drops down. After resting for some time, they can follow the restrictions again. But during this pause the second wave can come and become even stronger than the first one. Social dynamics should be considered. The social physics models of social stress complement the classical epidemics models.

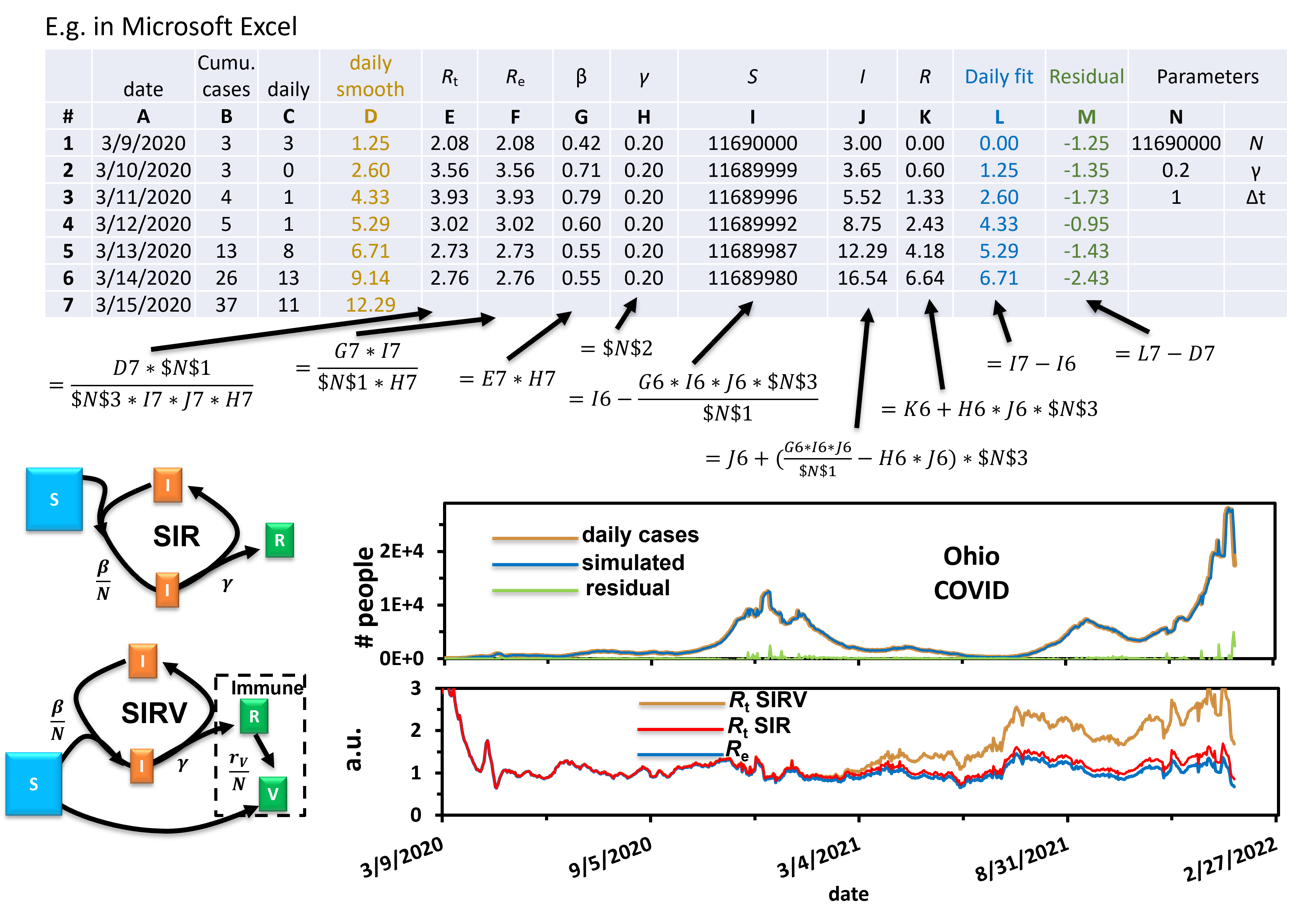
An example of using the numerical SIR model to fit the COVID-19 data (from U.S. CDC) in the state of Ohio, U.S.A. $R_t$ fitted using the SIR and the SIRV model are both shown. Note that although the SIR model can model an individual wave, a more complex model like SIR_{SS} would better model multiple waves.

The simplest SIR-social stress (SIR_{SS}) model is organised as follows. The susceptible individuals (S) can be split in three subgroups by the types of behavior: ignorant or unaware of the epidemic (S_{ign}), rationally resistant (S_{res}), and exhausted (S_{exh}) that do not react on the external stimuli (this is a sort of refractory period). In other words: S(t) = S_{ign}(t) + S_{res}(t) + S_{exh}(t). Symbolically, the social stress model can be presented by the "reaction scheme" (where I denotes the infected individuals):

- ${\color{blue}{\mathcal{S_{ign}}+2\mathcal{I} \to \mathcal{S_{res}}+2\mathcal{I}}}$ – mobilization reaction (the autocatalytic form here means that the transition rate is proportional to the square of the infected fraction I);
- ${\color{blue}{\mathcal{S_{res}} \to \mathcal{S_{exh}}}}$ – exhaustion process due to fatigue from anti-epidemic restrictions;
- ${\color{blue}{\mathcal{S_{exh}} \to \mathcal{S_{ign}}}}$ – slow relaxation to the initial state (end of the refractory period).

The main SIR epidemic reaction

- ${\color{blue}{\mathcal{S_{...}}+\mathcal{I} \to \mathcal{2I}}}$

has different reaction rate constants $\beta$ for S_{ign}, S_{res}, and S_{exh}. Presumably, for S_{res}, $\beta$ is lower than for S_{ign} and S_{ign}.

The differences between countries are concentrated in two kinetic constants: the rate of mobilization and the rate of exhaustion calculated for COVID-19 epidemic in 13 countries. These constants for this epidemic in all countries can be extracted by the fitting of the SIR_{SS} model to publicly available data

=== KdV-SIR equation ===
Based on the classical SIR model, a Korteweg-de Vries (KdV)–SIR equation and its analytical solution have been proposed to illustrate the fundamental dynamics of an epidemic wave, the dependence of solutions on parameters, and the dependence of predictability horizons on various types of solutions. The KdV-SIR equation is written as follows:

$\frac{d^2I}{dt} -\sigma_o^2 I + \frac{3}{2} \frac{\sigma_o^2} {I_{max}} I^2 = 0$.

Here,

$\sigma_o = \gamma (R_o -1)$,

$R_o = \frac{\beta}{\gamma} \frac{S_o}{N}$,

and

$I_{max}=\frac{S_o}{2}\frac{(R_o-1)^2}{R_o^2}$.

$S_o$ indicates the initial value of the state variable $S$. Parameters $\sigma_o$(σ-naught) and $R_o$ (R-naught) are the time-independent relative growth rate and basic reproduction number, respectively. $I_{max}$ presents the maximum of the state variables $I$(for the number of infected persons). The KdV-SIR equation shares the same form as the Korteweg–De Vries equation in the traveling wave coordinate. An analytical solution to the KdV-SIR equation is written as follows:

$I=I_{max}sech^2 \left( \frac{\sigma_o}{2}t \right)$,

which represents a solitary wave solution.

== Heterogeneous (structured, Bayesian) model ==
Modeling a full population of possibly millions people using two constants $\beta$ and $\gamma$ seem far fetched; each individual has personal characteristics that influence the propagation : immunity status, contact habits and so on. So it is interesting to know what happens if, for instance, $\beta$ and $\gamma$ are not two constants but some random variables (a pair for each individual). This procedure has several names : "heterogeneous model", "structuration" (see also below for age structured models) or "Bayesian" view. Surprising results emerge, for instance it was proved in that the number of infected at the peak of a heterogeneous epidemic is smaller than the deterministic epidemic having same average $\beta$; the same holds true for the total epidemic size $S(0)-S(\infty)$ and other models, e.g. SEIR.

== Modelling vaccination ==
The SIR model can be modified to model vaccination. Typically these introduce an additional compartment to the SIR model, $V$, for vaccinated individuals. Below are some examples.

=== Vaccinating newborns ===
In presence of a communicable diseases, one of the main tasks is that of eradicating it via prevention measures and, if possible, via the establishment of a mass vaccination program. Consider a disease for which the newborn are vaccinated (with a vaccine giving lifelong immunity) at a rate $P \in (0,1)$:

$$\begin{align}
\frac{dS}{dt} & = \nu N (1-P) - \mu S - \beta \frac{I}{N} S \\[8pt]
\frac{dI}{dt} & = \beta \frac{I}{N} S - (\mu+\gamma)  I \\[8pt]
\frac{dV}{dt} & = \nu N P - \mu V
\end{align}$$

where $V$ is the class of vaccinated subjects. It is immediate to show that:

$$\lim_{t \to +\infty} V(t)= N P,$$

thus we shall deal with the long term behavior of $S$ and $I$, for which it holds that:

$$R_0 (1-P) \le 1 \Rightarrow  \lim_{t \to +\infty} \left(S(t),I(t)\right) = DFE = \left(N \left(1-P\right),0\right)$$

$$R_0 (1-P) > 1 , \quad I(0)> 0 \Rightarrow  \lim_{t \to +\infty} \left(S(t),I(t)\right) = EE = \left(\frac{N}{R_0(1-P)},N \left(R_0 (1-P)-1\right)\right).$$

In other words, if

$$P < P^{*}= 1-\frac{1}{R_0}$$

the vaccination program is not successful in eradicating the disease, on the contrary, it will remain endemic, although at lower levels than the case of absence of vaccinations. This means that the mathematical model suggests that for a disease whose basic reproduction number may be as high as 18 one should vaccinate at least 94.4% of newborns in order to eradicate the disease.

=== Vaccination and information ===
Modern societies are facing the challenge of "rational" exemption, i.e. the family's decision to not vaccinate children as a consequence of a "rational" comparison between the perceived risk from infection and that from getting damages from the vaccine. In order to assess whether this behavior is really rational, i.e. if it can equally lead to the eradication of the disease, one may simply assume that the vaccination rate is an increasing function of the number of infectious subjects:

$$P=P(I), \quad P'(I)>0.$$

In such a case the eradication condition becomes:

$$P(0) \ge P^{*},$$

i.e. the baseline vaccination rate should be greater than the "mandatory vaccination" threshold, which, in case of exemption, cannot hold. Thus, "rational" exemption might be myopic since it is based only on the current low incidence due to high vaccine coverage, instead taking into account future resurgence of infection due to coverage decline.

=== Vaccination of non-newborns ===
In case there also are vaccinations of non newborns at a rate ρ the equation for the susceptible and vaccinated subject has to be modified as follows:

$$\begin{align}
\frac{dS}{dt} & = \mu N (1-P) - \mu S - \rho S - \beta \frac{I}{N} S \\[8pt]
\frac{dV}{dt} & = \mu N P + \rho S - \mu V
\end{align}$$

leading to the following eradication condition:

$$P \ge 1- \left(1+\frac{\rho}{\mu}\right)\frac{1}{R_0}$$

=== Pulse vaccination strategy ===
This strategy repeatedly vaccinates a defined age-cohort (such as young children or the elderly) in a susceptible population over time. Using this strategy, the block of susceptible individuals is then immediately removed, making it possible to eliminate an infectious disease, (such as measles), from the entire population. Every T time units a constant fraction p of susceptible subjects is vaccinated in a relatively short (with respect to the dynamics of the disease) time. This leads to the following impulsive differential equations for the susceptible and vaccinated subjects:

$$\begin{align}
\frac{dS}{dt} & = \mu N  - \mu S - \beta \frac{I}{N} S, \quad S(n T^+) = (1-p) S(n T^-), & & n=0,1,2,\ldots \\[8pt]
\frac{dV}{dt} & = - \mu V, \quad V(n T^+) = V(n T^-) + p S(n T^-), & & n=0,1,2,\ldots
\end{align}$$

It is easy to see that by setting I = 0 one obtains that the dynamics of the susceptible subjects is given by:

$$S^*(t) = 1- \frac{p}{1-(1-p)E^{-\mu T}} E^{-\mu MOD(t,T)}$$

and that the eradication condition is:

$$R_0 \int_0^T S^*(t) \, dt < 1$$

=== Vaccination games ===
A huge literature recognizes that the vaccination can be seen as a game: in a population where everybody is vaccinated any epidemic will die off immediately so an additional person will have no interest to vaccinate at all. On the contrary, a person arriving in a population where nobody is vaccinated will have all incentives to vaccinate (the epidemic will break loose in such a population). So, it seems that the individual has interest to do the opposite of the population as a whole. But the population is the sum of all individuals, and the previous affirmation should be false. So, in fact, a Nash equilibrium is reached. Technical tools to treat such situations involve game theory or modern tools such as Mean-field game theory.

== The influence of age: age-structured models ==
Age has a deep influence on the disease spread rate in a population, especially the contact rate. This rate summarizes the effectiveness of contacts between susceptible and infectious subjects. Taking into account the ages of the epidemic classes $s(t,a),i(t,a),r(t,a)$ (to limit ourselves to the susceptible-infectious-removed scheme) such that:

$$S(t)=\int_0^{a_M} s(t,a)\,da$$

$$I(t)=\int_0^{a_M} i(t,a)\,da$$

$$R(t)=\int_0^{a_M} r(t,a)\,da$$

(where $a_M \le +\infty$ is the maximum admissible age) and their dynamics is not described, as one might think, by "simple" partial differential equations, but by integro-differential equations:

$$\partial_t s(t,a) + \partial_a s(t,a) = -\mu(a) s(a,t) - s(a,t)\int_0^{a_M} k(a,a_1;t)i(a_1,t)\,da_1$$

$$\partial_t i(t,a) + \partial_a i(t,a) =  s(a,t)\int_{0}^{a_M}{k(a,a_1;t)i(a_1,t)da_1}  -\mu(a) i(a,t) - \gamma(a)i(a,t)$$

$$\partial_t r(t,a) + \partial_a r(t,a) =   -\mu(a) r(a,t) + \gamma(a)i(a,t)$$

where:

$$F(a,t,i(\cdot,\cdot))=\int_0^{a_M} k(a,a_1;t)i(a_1,t) \, da_1$$

is the force of infection, which, of course, will depend, though the contact kernel $k(a,a_1;t)$ on the interactions between the ages.

Complexity is added by the initial conditions for newborns (i.e. for a=0), that are straightforward for infectious and removed:

$$i(t,0)=r(t,0)=0$$

but that are nonlocal for the density of susceptible newborns:

$$s(t,0)= \int_0^{a_M} \left(\varphi_s(a) s(a,t)+\varphi_i(a) i(a,t)+\varphi_r(a) r(a,t)\right) \, da$$

where $\varphi_j(a), j=s,i,r$ are the fertilities of the adults.

Moreover, defining now the density of the total population $n(t,a)=s(t,a)+i(t,a)+r(t,a)$ one obtains:

$$\partial_t n(t,a) + \partial_a n(t,a) = -\mu(a) n(a,t)$$

In the simplest case of equal fertilities in the three epidemic classes, we have that in order to have demographic equilibrium the following necessary and sufficient condition linking the fertility $\varphi(.)$ with the mortality $\mu(a)$ must hold:

$$1 = \int_0^{a_M} \varphi(a) \exp\left(- \int_0^a{\mu(q)dq} \right) \, da$$

and the demographic equilibrium is

$$n^*(a)=C \exp\left(- \int_0^a \mu(q) \, dq \right),$$

automatically ensuring the existence of the disease-free solution:

$$DFS(a)= (n^*(a),0,0).$$

A basic reproduction number can be calculated as the spectral radius of an appropriate functional operator.

=== Next-generation method ===
One way to calculate $R_0$ is to average the expected number of new infections over all possible infected types. The next-generation method is a general method of deriving $R_0$ when more than one class of infectives is involved. This method, originally introduced by Diekmann et al. (1990), can be used for models with underlying age structure or spatial structure, among other possibilities. In this picture, the spectral radius of the next-generation matrix $G$ gives the basic reproduction number, $R_0 = \rho(G).$

Consider a sexually transmitted disease. In a naive population where almost everyone is susceptible, but the infection seed, if the expected number of gender 1 is $f$ and the expected number of infected gender 2 is $m$, we can know how many would be infected in the next-generation. Such that the next-generation matrix $G$ can be written as:
$$G = \begin{pmatrix} 0 & f \\ m & 0 \end{pmatrix},$$
where each element $g_{ij}$ is the expected number of secondary infections of gender $i$ caused by a single infected individual of gender $j$, assuming that the population of gender $i$ is entirely susceptible. Diagonal elements are zero because people of the same gender cannot transmit the disease to each other but, for example, each $f$ can transmit the disease to $m$, on average. Meaning that each element $g_{ij}$ is a reproduction number, but one where who infects whom is accounted for. If generation $a$ is represented with $\phi_a$ then the next generation $\phi_{a+1}$ would be $G\phi_a$.

The spectral radius of the next-generation matrix is the basic reproduction number, $R_0 = \rho(G) = \sqrt{mf}$, that is here, the geometric mean of the expected number of each gender in the next-generation. Note that multiplication factors $f$ and $m$ alternate because, the infectious person has to 'pass through' a second gender before it can enter a new host of the first gender. In other words, it takes two generations to get back to the same type, and every two generations numbers are multiplied by $m$×$f$. The average per generation multiplication factor is therefore $\sqrt{mf}$. Note that $G$ is a non-negative matrix so it has single, unique, positive, real eigenvalue which is strictly greater than all the others.

=== Next-generation matrix for compartmental models ===
In mathematical modelling of infectious disease, the dynamics of spreading is usually described through a set of non-linear ordinary differential equations (ODE). So there is always $n$ coupled equations of form $\dot{C_i}={\operatorname{d}\!C_i\over\operatorname{d}\!t} = f(C_1, C_2, ..., C_n)$ which shows how the number of people in compartment $C_i$ changes over time. For example, in a SIR model, $C_1 = S$, $C_2 = I$, and $C_3 = R$. Compartmental models have a disease-free equilibrium (DFE) meaning that it is possible to find an equilibrium while setting the number of infected people to zero, $I=0$. In other words, as a rule, there is an infection-free steady state. This solution, also usually ensures that the disease-free equilibrium is also an equilibrium of the system. There is another fixed point known as an Endemic Equilibrium (EE) where the disease is not totally eradicated and remains in the population. Mathematically, $R_0$ is a threshold for stability of a disease-free equilibrium such that:

$$R_0 \le 1 \Rightarrow  \lim_{t \to \infty} (C_1(t),C_2(t),\cdots, C_n(t)) = \textrm{DFE}$$
$$R_0 > 1 , I(0)> 0 \Rightarrow  \lim_{t \to \infty} (C_1(t),C_2(t),\cdots, C_n(t))  = \textrm{EE}.$$

To calculate $R_0$, the first step is to linearise around the disease-free equilibrium (DFE), but for the infected subsystem of non-linear ODEs which describe the production of new infections and changes in state among infected individuals. Epidemiologically, the linearisation reflects that $R_0$ characterizes the potential for initial spread of an infectious person in a naive population, assuming the change in the susceptible population is negligible during the initial spread. A linear system of ODEs can always be described by a matrix. So, the next step is to construct a linear positive operator that provides the next generation of infected people when applied to the present generation. Note that this operator (matrix) is responsible for the number of infected people, not all the compartments. Iteration of this operator describes the initial progression of infection within the heterogeneous population. So comparing the spectral radius of this operator to unity determines whether the generations of infected people grow or not. $R_0$ can be written as a product of the infection rate near the disease-free equilibrium and average duration of infectiousness. It is used to find the peak and final size of an epidemic.

==== The SEIR model with vital dynamics and constant population ====
As described in the example above, so many epidemic processes can be described with a SIR‌ model. However, for many important infections, such as COVID-19, there is a significant latency period during which individuals have been infected but are not yet infectious themselves. During this period the individual is in compartment E (for exposed). Here, the formation of the next-generation matrix from the SEIR‌ model involves determining two compartments, infected and non-infected, since they are the populations that spread the infection. So we only need to model the exposed, E, and infected, I, compartments. Consider a population characterized by a death rate $\mu$ and birth rate $\lambda$ where a communicable disease is spreading. As in the previous example, we can use the transition rates between the compartments per capita such that $\beta$ be the infection rate, $\gamma$ be the recovery rate, and $\kappa$ be the rate at which a latent individual becomes infectious. Then, we can define the model dynamics using the following equations:

$$\begin{cases} \dot{S} = \lambda - \mu S - \beta SI, \\\\ \dot{E} = \beta SI - (\mu+\kappa)E,  \\\\ \dot{I} = \kappa E - (\mu+\gamma)I, \\\\ \dot{R} = \gamma I - \mu R. \end{cases}$$
Here we have 4 compartments and we can define vector $\mathrm{x} = (S, E, I, R)$ where $\mathrm{x}_i$ denotes the number or proportion of individuals in the $i$-th compartment. Let $F_i(\mathrm{x})$ be the rate of appearance of new infections in compartment $i$ such that it includes only infections that are newly arising, but does not include terms which describe the transfer of infectious individuals from one infected compartment to another. Then if $V_i^+$ is the rate of transfer of individuals into compartment $i$ by all other means and $V_i^-$ is the rate of transfer of individuals out of the $i$-th compartment, then the difference $F_i(\mathrm{x}) - V_i(\mathrm{x})$ gives the rate of change of such that $V_i(\mathrm{x}) = V_i^-(\mathrm{x}) - V_i^+ (\mathrm{x})$.

We can now make matrices of partial derivatives of $F$ and $V$ such that

$F_{ij} = {\partial\! \ F_i(\mathrm{x}^*)\over\partial \! \ \mathrm{x}_j}$ and $V_{ij} = {\partial\! \ V_i(\mathrm{x}^*)\over\partial \! \ \mathrm{x}_j}$ , where $\mathrm{x}^* = (S^*, E^*, I^*, R^*) = (\lambda/\mu, 0, 0, 0)$ is the disease-free equilibrium.

We now can form the next-generation matrix (operator) $G = FV^{-1}$. Basically, $F$ is a non-negative matrix which represents the infection rates near the equilibrium, and $V$ is an M-matrix for linear transition terms making $V^{-1}$ a matrix which represents the average duration of infectiousness. Therefore, $G_{ij}$ gives the rate at which infected individuals in $\mathrm{x}_j$ produce new infections in $\mathrm{x}_i$, times the average length of time an individual spends in a single visit to compartment $j.$

Finally, for this SEIR process we can have:

$$F = \begin{pmatrix} 0 & \beta S^* \\ 0 & 0 \end{pmatrix}$$
and
$$V = \begin{pmatrix} \mu + \kappa & 0 \\ -\kappa & \gamma + \mu \end{pmatrix}$$
and so $R_0 = \rho( FV^{-1}) = \frac{\kappa\beta S^*}{(\mu+\kappa)(\mu+\gamma)}.$

== Estimation methods ==
The basic reproduction number can be estimated through examining detailed transmission chains or through genomic sequencing. However, it is most frequently calculated using epidemiological models. During an epidemic, typically the number of diagnosed infections $N(t)$ over time $t$ is known. In the early stages of an epidemic, growth is exponential, with a logarithmic growth rate
$$K := \frac{d\ln(N)}{dt}.$$
For exponential growth, $N$ can be interpreted as the cumulative number of diagnoses (including individuals who have recovered) or the present number of infection cases; the logarithmic growth rate is the same for either definition. In order to estimate $R_0$, assumptions are necessary about the time delay between infection and diagnosis and the time between infection and starting to be infectious.

In exponential growth, $K$ is related to the doubling time $T_d$ as
$$K=\frac{\ln(2)}{T_d}.$$

=== Simple model ===
If an individual, after getting infected, infects exactly $R_0$ new individuals only after exactly a time $\tau$ (the serial interval) has passed, then the number of infectious individuals over time grows as
$$n_E(t) = n_E(0)\, R_0^{t/\tau} = n_E(0)\,e^{Kt}$$
or
$$\ln(n_E(t)) = \ln(n_E(0))+\ln(R_0)t/\tau.$$
The underlying matching differential equation is
$$\frac{dn_E(t)}{dt} =n_E(t)\frac {\ln(R_0)}{\tau}.$$
or
$$\frac{d\ln(n_E(t))}{dt} =\frac {\ln(R_0)}{\tau}.$$
In this case, $R_0 = e^{K \tau}$ or $K = \frac{\ln R_0}{\tau}$.

For example, with $\tau=5~\mathrm{d}$ and $K=0.183~\mathrm{d}^{-1}$, we would find $R_0=2.5$.

If $R_0$ is time dependent
$$\ln(n_E(t)) = \ln(n_E(0))+\frac{1}{\tau}\int\limits_{0}^{t}\ln(R_0(t))dt$$
showing that it may be important to keep $\ln(R_0)$ below 0, time-averaged, to avoid exponential growth.

=== Latent infectious period, isolation after diagnosis ===
In this model, an individual infection has the following stages:

1. Exposed: an individual is infected, but has no symptoms and does not yet infect others. The average duration of the exposed state is $\tau_E$.
2. Latent infectious: an individual is infected, has no symptoms, but does infect others. The average duration of the latent infectious state is $\tau_I$. The individual infects $R_0$ other individuals during this period.
3. Isolation after diagnosis: measures are taken to prevent further infections, for example by isolating the infected person.

This is a SEIR model and $R_0$ may be written in the following form
$$R_0 = 1 + K(\tau_E+\tau_I) + K^2\tau_E\tau_I.$$
This estimation method has been applied to COVID-19 and SARS. It follows from the differential equation for the number of exposed individuals $n_E$ and the number of latent infectious individuals $n_I$,
$$\frac{d}{dt} \begin{pmatrix} n_E \\ n_I \end{pmatrix} = \begin{pmatrix} -1/\tau_E & R_0/\tau_I \\ 1/\tau_E & -1/\tau_I \end{pmatrix} \begin{pmatrix} n_E \\ n_I \end{pmatrix}.$$
The largest eigenvalue of the matrix is the logarithmic growth rate $K$, which can be solved for $R_0$.

In the special case $\tau_I = 0$, this model results in $R_0=1+K\tau_E$, which is different from the simple model above ($R_0=\exp(K\tau_E)$). For example, with the same values $\tau=5~\mathrm{d}$ and $K=0.183~\mathrm{d}^{-1}$, we would find $R_0=1.9$, rather than the true value of $2.5$. The difference is due to a subtle difference in the underlying growth model; the matrix equation above assumes that newly infected patients are currently already contributing to infections, while in fact infections only occur due to the number infected at $\tau_E$ ago. A more correct treatment would require the use of delay differential equations.

Latent period is the transition time between contagion event and disease manifestation. In cases of diseases with varying latent periods, the basic reproduction number can be calculated as the sum of the reproduction numbers for each transition time into the disease. An example of this is tuberculosis (TB). Blower and coauthors calculated from a simple model of TB the following reproduction number:
$$R_0 = R_0^{\text{FAST}} + R_0^{\text{SLOW}}$$
In their model, it is assumed that the infected individuals can develop active TB by either direct progression (the disease develops immediately after infection) considered above as FAST tuberculosis or endogenous reactivation (the disease develops years after the infection) considered above as SLOW tuberculosis.

== Other considerations within compartmental epidemic models ==
=== Vertical transmission ===
In the case of some diseases such as AIDS and hepatitis B, it is possible for the offspring of infected parents to be born infected. This transmission of the disease down from the mother is referred to as vertical transmission. The influx of additional members into the infected category can be considered within the model by including a fraction of the newborn members in the infected compartment.

=== Vector transmission ===
Diseases transmitted from human to human indirectly, i.e. malaria spread by way of mosquitoes, are transmitted through a vector. In these cases, the infection transfers from human to insect and an epidemic model must include both species, generally requiring many more compartments than a model for direct transmission.

=== Others ===
Other occurrences which may need to be considered when modeling an epidemic include things such as the following:

- Non-homogeneous mixing
- Variable infectivity
- Distributions that are spatially non-uniform
- Diseases caused by macroparasites

== Deterministic versus stochastic epidemic models ==
The deterministic models presented here are valid only in case of sufficiently large populations, and as such should be used cautiously. These models are only valid in the thermodynamic limit, where the population is effectively infinite. In stochastic models, the long-time endemic equilibrium derived above, does not hold, as there is a finite probability that the number of infected individuals drops below one in a system. In a true system then, the pathogen may not propagate, as no host will be infected. But, in deterministic mean-field models, the number of infected can take on real, namely, non-integer values of infected hosts, and the number of hosts in the model can be less than one, but more than zero, thereby allowing the pathogen in the model to propagate. The reliability of compartmental models is limited to compartmental applications.

One of the possible extensions of mean-field models considers the spreading of epidemics on a network based on percolation theory concepts. Stochastic epidemic models have been studied on different networks and more recently applied to the COVID-19 pandemic.

== See also ==
- Attack rate
- Basic reproduction number
- Flatten the curve
- List of COVID-19 simulation models
- Mathematical modelling in epidemiology
- Modifiable areal unit problem
- Next-generation matrix
- Risk assessment
