= Hilda Phoebe Hudson =

English mathematician

- Hilda Phoebe Hudson
- Born: 11 June 1881; Cambridge, England
- Died: 26 November 1965 (aged 84); Chiswick, London, England
- Education: Cambridge and Berlin
- Occupation: mathematician
- Known for: Cremona transformation
- Parent: Professor William Henry Hoare Hudson

Hilda Phoebe Hudson (11 June 1881 Cambridge – 26 November 1965 London) was an English mathematician who worked on algebraic geometry, in particular on Cremona transformations. Hudson was interested in the link between mathematics and her religious beliefs.

== Life and work ==
In 1900 Hudson gained a scholarship and entered Newnham College at the University of Cambridge, graduating in 1903, coming seventh equal among the First Class students. After a year of further study at the University of Berlin, she returned to Newnham in 1905, first as lecturer in mathematics and later as Associate Research Fellow. Trinity College Dublin awarded her an ad eundam MA, and later a DSc, in 1906 and 1913, respectively.

She was an Invited Speaker of the International Congress of Mathematicians (ICM) in 1912 at Cambridge UK. Although Laura Pisati had been invited to the 1908 ICM, she died just before the start of the conference, so Hudson became the first female invited speaker at an ICM.

She spent the academic year 1912–1913 at Bryn Mawr in the US, and the years 1913–1917 back in England, this time as lecturer at West Ham Technical Institute. She joined an Air Ministry subdivision undertaking aeronautical engineering research in 1917, where she applied pioneering work on the application of mathematical modelling to aircraft design. She was appointed OBE in 1919. As a distinguished mathematician she was one of the few women of her time to serve on the council of the London Mathematical Society.

Most of Hudson's pure mathematical research was concerned with surfaces and plane curves, her special interest being in Cremona transformations. Her 1916 monograph Ruler and Compasses was well-received as "a welcome addition to the literature on the boundary between elementary and advanced mathematics". Her 454-page 1927 treatise Cremona transformations in plane and space is considered by John Semple to be her magnum opus.

Hudson was deeply religious, and a supporter of the Student Christian Movement. She sought, in her work, to understand the revelation of the glory of God in the beauty she found in mathematics. In later life, debilitated by arthritis, she moved into St Mary's Convent and Nursing home, an Anglican convent, where she died on 26 November 1965.

== Aeronautical Engineering ==
During World War I, Hudson worked for the UK's Air Department of the Admiralty. While there, she published on the strength of struts, and methods for incorporating incidence wires between biplane wings into stress calculations.

== Epidemiology ==
Hudson published work with Ronald Ross on epidemiology and the measurement of disease spread. "The classical susceptible-infectious-recovered (SIR) model, originated from the seminal papers of Ross and Ross and Hudson in 1916–1917 and the fundamental contributions of Kermack and McKendrick in 1927–1932, describes the transmission of infectious diseases between susceptible and infective individuals and provides the basic framework for almost all later epidemic models."

== Books ==
- Ruler and Compasses, first published as a monograph (Longman's Modern Mathematical Series, 1916) and then included in the compendium Squaring the circle and other monographs (Chelsea n.d.)
- Cremona Transformations in Plane and Space, Cambridge University Press, 1927.
