= Lowell Reed =

President of Johns Hopkins University

Lowell J. Reed
- Born: January 8, 1886; Berlin, New Hampshire
- Died: April 29, 1966 (aged 80); Berlin, New Hampshire
- Education: University of Pennsylvania
- Known for: Reed–Frost model
- Scientific career
- Fields: Statistics
- Workplaces: Johns Hopkins University
- Doctoral advisor: Oliver Edmunds Glenn
- Doctoral students: Joseph Berkson; Margaret Merrell

Lowell Jacob Reed (January 8, 1886 – April 29, 1966) was 7th president of the Johns Hopkins University in Baltimore, Maryland. He was born in Berlin, New Hampshire, the son of Jason Reed, a millwright and farmer, and Louella Coffin Reed.

== Education and career ==
He had a long career as a research scientist in biostatistics and public health administration at Hopkins, where he was previously dean and director of the School of Public Health and later was vice president in charge of medical activities. He was an Invited Speaker at the ICM in 1924 in Toronto. In 1927 he was elected as a Fellow of the American Statistical Association. As a researcher, he developed a well known statistical technique for estimating the ED-50, and his work with epidemiologist Wade Hampton Frost on the Reed–Frost epidemic models also remains well known. He died in Berlin, New Hampshire, in 1966.

Lowell Reed attended the University of Maine, graduating in 1907 with a degree in electrical engineering. In 1915 he earned a PhD in mathematics at the University of Pennsylvania. This unusual combination of disciplines was put to use when he arrived at Johns Hopkins University in 1918, where he organized the Department of Biometry and Vital Statistics at the School of Hygiene and Public Health (now the Bloomberg School of Public Health) and was credited with coining the term "biostatistics". He became chair of that department in 1925 and, in 1947, was named vice president in charge of medical activities.

Reed retired from the Hopkins faculty in June 1953, only to be recalled later that summer to serve as president when Detlev Bronk departed for Rockefeller University. In September 1953, he returned to Baltimore from his home in New Hampshire to accept the presidency, stating, "For 30-odd years, I have had a glorious time at the Hopkins. I owed it to the people there to return." Although he made it clear that he did not plan to serve indefinitely, he did not regard himself as a caretaker or interim president. He oversaw the end of the Owen Lattimore espionage indictments (all charges were dropped in 1955), and new construction on the various Hopkins campuses, while still keeping a hand in biostatistics.

Reed retired for the second and final time in 1956, succeeded as president by Milton S. Eisenhower. Returning to his beloved New Hampshire farm, he again took up his hobbies of woodworking, painting, hiking and camping, and enjoyed an active retirement until his death in 1966. Reed Hall, a residence hall for medical school students and house staff on the Johns Hopkins medical campus, was named in his honor in 1962.

== Selected publications ==
- with Raymond Pearl: "On the rate of growth of the population of the United States since 1790 and its mathematical representation." Proceedings of the National Academy of Sciences 6, no. 6 (1920): 275–288.
- with Raymond Pearl: "Skew-growth curves." Proceedings of the National Academy of Sciences 11, no. 1 (1925): 16–22.
- with Raymond Pearl: "On the summation of logistic curves." Journal of the Royal Statistical Society 90, no. 4 (1927): 729–746. doi:10.2307/2341367
- with Hugo Muench: "A simple method of estimating fifty per cent endpoints." American journal of epidemiology 27, no. 3 (1938): 493–497.
- with Margaret Merrell: "A short method for constructing an abridged life table." American Journal of Hygiene 30 (1939).
- with Raymond Pearl and Joseph F. Kish: "The logistic curve and the census count of 1940." Science (New York, NY) 92, no. 2395 (1940): 486–488. doi:10.1126/science.92.2395.486
