= Conductance-Based Refractory Density model =

Mathematical model of neuronal population

The Conductance-Based Refractory Density (CBRD) approach enables the derivation of a macroscopic model of a neuronal ensemble based on the microscopic dynamics of individual neurons, specifically those described by the Hodgkin-Huxley-type framework.: Here, a neuronal ensemble (or neuronal population) refers to as a large (ideally infinite) set of uncoupled stochastic neurons. These neurons receive common input in the form of synaptic current or synaptic conductances. The output signal is the population firing rate.

== Single neuron ==
As a microscopic model of a single neuron, we consider the equations for the neuronal membrane potential $U$ and gating variables $x, y$ in the following form:

$C ~{ dU \over dt} =-I_L-I_{voltage-gated}-I_{synaptic}+\sigma ~\xi(t)$

${dx \over dt}={x_{\infty}(U)-x \over \tau_x(U)}$

${dy \over dt}={y_{\infty}(U)-y \over \tau_y(U)}$

where $I_L, ~I_{voltage-gated}$ and $I_{synaptic}$ are the leak, voltage-gated and synaptic currents, respectively; $\sigma~\xi(t)$ represents Gaussian white noise with amplitude $\sigma$; $C$ is the membrane capacitance; $x_{\infty}, ~y_{\infty}, ~\tau_x ~\text{and} ~\tau_y$ are the Hodgkin-Huxley-like approximations of voltage-dependent characteristics of activation and inactivation characteristics for all channels considered.

== Population ==
In the CBRD approach, these equations are parameterized with the time elapsed since the last spike $t^{*}$ (referred to as age). According to this model, neurons move in the $t^{*}$-space (Figure) at a unity speed. If the membrane potential of a neuron approaches the threshold $V^T$, then with a certain probability $H$, the neuron generates a spike and resets to $t^{*}=0$, representing the state immediately after the spike.

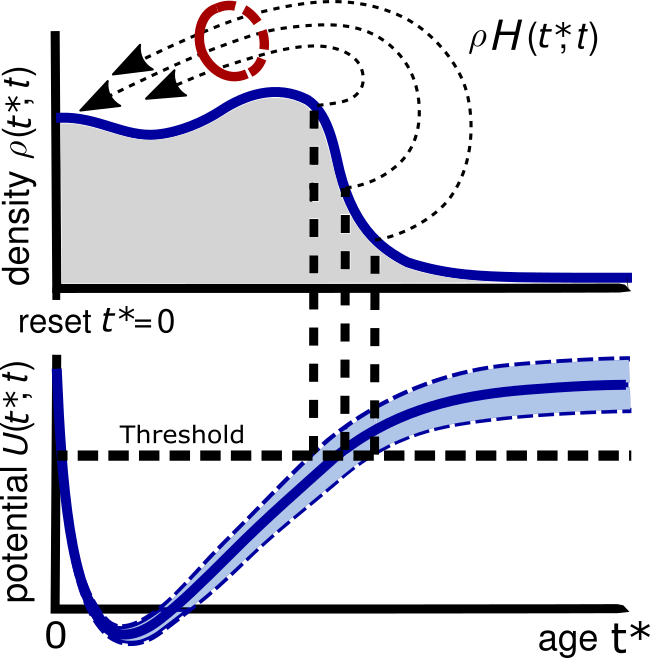
CBRD model describes neuronal evolution in the space of the time elapsed since the last spike.

The CBRD model describes the evolution of neurons in the space of the time elapsed since the last spike. The ordinary differential equations are reformulated into transport equations. The transport equation for the neuronal density, referred to as the refractory density $\rho(t,t^{*})$, completes the system of equations. Here, the probability of firing, represented by the hazard-function $H(U(t,t^{*}), \dot U(t,t^{*}))$, depends on the neuronal membrane potential and its derivative in time. The final equations of the CBRD model are one-dimensional transport equations, with the right-hand sides remaining the same as in the original equations:

- for the neuronal (refractory) density:

${\partial \rho \over \partial t} + {\partial \rho \over \partial t^{*}}=-\rho H$

- for the membrane potential:

$C \left( {\partial U \over \partial t} + {\partial U \over \partial t^{*}} \right)=-I_L-I_{voltage-gated}-I_{synaptic}$

- for the gating variables:

${\partial x \over \partial t} + {\partial x \over \partial t^{*}}={x_{\infty}(U)-x \over \tau_x(U)}$

${\partial y \over \partial t} + {\partial y \over \partial t^{*}}={y_{\infty}(U)-y \over \tau_y(U)}$

The firing rate $\nu(t)$ is obtained from the conservation of the total number of neurons:

$\nu(t) \equiv \rho(t,t^{*})\vert_{t^{*}=0}=\int_{+0}^{\infty}\rho H~dt^{*}$

The approximation of the hazard function $H(U(t,t^{*}), \dot U(t,t^{*}))$ for the case of white Gaussian noise is derived by solving the Fokker-Planck equation for voltage fluctuations near an arbitrary time-depending mean voltage $U(t,t^{*})$

$H(U, \dot U)=A+B,$ where $A= {g_L \over C} ~e^{(0.0061-1.12 T - 0.257 T^2 - 0.072 T^3 - 0.0117 T^4)},$ $B= {2 \over {\sqrt{\pi} ~\sigma }} \left[ {\dot U } \right]_{+} {\exp(-T^2) \over {1+\hbox{erf}(T)}},$ $T={V^T-U \over {\sigma}}$,

where $V^T$ is the threshold and $g_L$ is the input (leak) conductance; $[~]_{+}$ is the Heaviside step function.

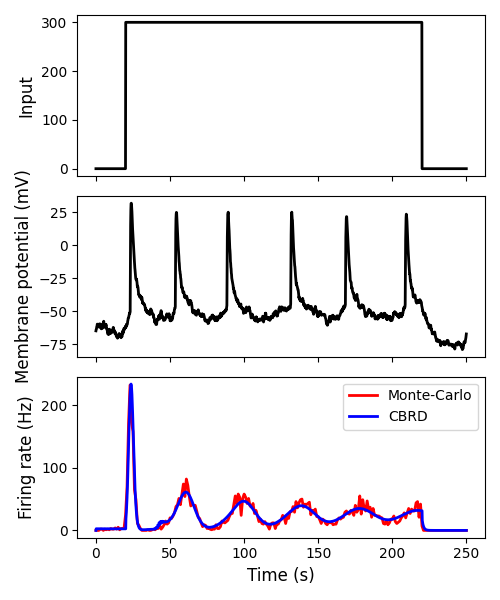
Simulation with CBRD model. Top to bottom: input, membrane potential of a representative neuron, firing rate calculated with the Monte Carlo method (N=1000) and the CBRD model

In simulations, the firing rate reflects the synchronization of neurons in transient states (Figure). The solutions for the firing rate calculated using the CBRD model converge to the results of Monte-Carlo simulations of single neurons.

A realization of the CBRD model, based on a specific realistic conductance-based neuron model is available as Python code.

== Generalizations ==
The approach has been generalized for the following cases:

- Colored noise
- Lognormal distribution of weights for the input current
- Finite-size population
- Two-compartment neurons
- Bursting neurons
- Alternative approximations of the hazard-function

== Applications ==
The CBRD model has been used to simulate cortical neural tissue activity, where neuronal populations are coupled population-to-population.
