= Kermack–McKendrick theory =

Mathematical model to describe the outbreak of an infectious disease

Kermack–McKendrick theory is a hypothesis that predicts the number and distribution of cases of an immunizing infectious disease over time as it is transmitted through a population based on characteristics of infectivity and recovery, under a strong-mixing assumption. Building on the research of Ronald Ross and Hilda Hudson, A. G. McKendrick and W. O. Kermack published their theory in a set of three articles from 1927, 1932, and 1933. Kermack–McKendrick theory is one of the sources of the SIR model and other related compartmental models. This theory was the first to explicitly account for the dependence of infection characteristics and transmissibility on the age of infection. Because of their seminal importance to the field of theoretical epidemiology, these articles were republished in the Bulletin of Mathematical Biology in 1991.

== Epidemic model (1927) ==
In its initial form, Kermack–McKendrick theory is a partial differential-equation model that structures the infected population in terms of age-of-infection, while using simple compartments for people who are susceptible (S), infected (I), and recovered/removed (R). Specified initial conditions would change over time according to

$$\frac{dS}{dt} = - \lambda S,$$

$$\frac{\partial i}{\partial t} + \frac{\partial i}{\partial a} = \delta(a)  \lambda S- \gamma(a) i,$$
$$I(t) =  \int_{0}^{\infty} i(a,t)\, da,$$

$$\frac{dR}{dt} = \int_{0}^\infty \gamma(a) i(a,t) \, da ,$$

where $\delta(a)$ is a Dirac delta-function and the infection pressure

$$\lambda = \int_0^\infty \beta(a) i(a,t) \, da .$$

This formulation is equivalent to defining the incidence of infection $i(t,0) = \lambda S$. Only in the special case when the removal rate $\gamma(a)$ and the transmission rate $\beta(a)$ are constant for all ages can the epidemic dynamics be expressed in terms of the prevalence $I(t)$, leading to the standard compartmental SIR model. This model only accounts for infection and removal events, which are sufficient to describe a simple epidemic, including the threshold condition necessary for an epidemic to start, but can not explain endemic disease transmission or recurring epidemics.

== Endemic disease (1932, 1933) ==
In their subsequent articles, Kermack and McKendrick extended their theory to allow for birth, migration, and death, as well as imperfect immunity. In modern notation, their model can be represented as

$$\frac{dS}{dt} = b_0 + b_S S + b_I I + b_R R - \lambda S - m_S S,$$

$$\frac{\partial i}{\partial t} + \frac{\partial i}{\partial a} = \delta(a) \lambda ( S + \sigma R ) - \gamma(a) i - \mu(a) i - m_i(a) i,$$

$$I(t) = \int_0^\infty i(a,t) \, da$$

$$\frac{dR}{dt} = \int_0^\infty \gamma(a) i(a,t) \, da - \sigma \lambda R - m_R R,$$

where $b_0$ is the immigration rate of susceptibles, b_{j} is the per-capita birth rate for state j, m_{j} is the per-capita mortality rate of individuals in state j, $\sigma$ is the relative-risk of infection to recovered individuals who are partially immune, and the infection pressure

$$\lambda = \int_0^\infty \beta(a) i(a,t) \, da .$$

Kermack and McKendrick were able to show that it admits a stationary solution where disease is endemic, as long as the supply of susceptible individuals is sufficiently large. This model is difficult to analyze in its full generality, and a number of open questions remain regarding its dynamics.

== See also ==
- Compartmental models in epidemiology
- Integro-differential equation
