= William Ogilvy Kermack =

Scottish biochemist (1898–1970)

- Born: 26 April 1898; Kirriemuir, Scotland
- Died: 20 July 1970 (aged 72); Aberdeen, Scotland
- Education: University of Aberdeen
- Known for: Kermack–McKendrick theory Kermack–McCrae identity
- Scientific career
- Fields: Statistics; Biochemistry

William Ogilvy Kermack FRS FRSE FRIC (26 April 1898 – 20 July 1970) was a Scottish biochemist. He made mathematical studies of epidemic spread and established links between environmental factors and specified diseases. He is noteworthy for being blind for the majority of his academic career. Together with Anderson Gray McKendrick he created the Kermack-McKendrick theory of infectious diseases.

== Early life and education ==
He was born on 26 April 1898 at 36 South Street in Kirriemuir, the son of William Kermack, a postman, and his wife, Helen Eassie Ogilvy. His mother was placed in an asylum soon after his birth and died when he was six and he was raised by his father's sister Margaret Osler Kermack, wife of David Marnie, a blacksmith. He was raised with their four children - his cousins.

William was educated at Webster's Seminary in Kirriemuir under headmaster Thomas Pullar. He won a bursary and began studying Mathematics and Natural Philosophy at the University of Aberdeen in 1914.

== Career ==
His university career was disrupted by the First World War during which he served in the Royal Air Force 1917–1918. He graduated from Aberdeen University late in 1918 and then moved to the Dyson Perrins Laboratory at the University of Oxford in which worked with William Perkin Jr for two years, on the alkaloid harmaline. At about same time, from 1919 to 1921, also worked at the research department of British Dyestuffs Corporation in Oxford. In 1921 he moved to Edinburgh to work as a Chemist for the Royal College of Physicians of Edinburgh. He continued postgraduate studies, gaining a DSc in 1925.

In 1922 collaborated with Nobel laureate in Chemistry, Sir Robert Robinson -it's uncertain if they actually met in person- on the development of "curly arrow", which is a graphical representation of electron direction during a chemical reaction.

Sadly, although he escaped the notoriously dangerous chemical warfare of First World War, he was blinded by a chemical explosion in his laboratory on 2 June 1924, at the age of 26, and never regained his sight.

In 1925 he was elected a Fellow of the Royal Society of Edinburgh. His proposers were Hector Munro Macdonald, George Barger, Sir James Walker, John Gray McKendrick and Anderson Gray McKendrick. He won the Society's Makdougall-Brisbane Prize (Royal Society of Edinburgh) for the period 1926 to 1928. In 1944 he was also elected a Fellow of the Royal Society of London.

St Andrews University awarded him an honorary doctorate (LLD) in 1937.

From 1949 to 1968 he served as Professor of Biological Chemistry at Aberdeen University.

== Death ==
He died on 20 July 1970 while still working at his desk inside Marischal College in Aberdeen.

== Family ==
In 1926 he married Elizabeth Raimunda Blazquez daughter of Raimundo Blazquez of Aguilas in Spain. They had one son, Derek Ogilvy Kermack

== Publications ==
- Modern Views of Atomic Structure (1935)
- The Stuff We're Made Of (1948)
