= Next-generation matrix =

In epidemiology, the next-generation matrix is used to derive the basic reproduction number, for a compartmental model of the spread of infectious diseases. In population dynamics it is used to compute the basic reproduction number for structured population models. It is also used in multi-type branching models for analogous computations.

The method to compute the basic reproduction ratio using the next-generation matrix is given by Diekmann et al. (1990) and van den Driessche and Watmough (2002). To calculate the basic reproduction number by using a next-generation matrix, the whole population is divided into $n$ compartments in which there are $m<n$ infected compartments. Let $x_i, i=1,2,3,\ldots,m$ be the numbers of infected individuals in the $i^{th}$ infected compartment at time t. Now, the epidemic model is

$\frac{\mathrm{d} x_i}{\mathrm{d}t}= F_i (x)-V_i(x)$, where $V_i(x)= [V^-_i(x)-V^+_i(x)]$

In the above equations, $F_i(x)$ represents the rate of appearance of new infections in compartment $i$. $V^+_i$ represents the rate of transfer of individuals into compartment $i$ by all other means, and $V^-_i (x)$ represents the rate of transfer of individuals out of compartment $i$. The above model can also be written as

$$\frac{\mathrm{d} x}{\mathrm{d}t}= F(x)-V(x)$$

where

$$F(x) = \begin{pmatrix}
F_1(x), & F_2(x), & \ldots, & F_m(x)
\end{pmatrix}^T$$

and

$$V(x) = \begin{pmatrix}
V_1(x), & V_2 (x), & \ldots, & V_m(x)
\end{pmatrix}^T.$$

Let $x_0$ be the disease-free equilibrium. The values of the parts of the Jacobian matrix $F(x)$ and $V(x)$ are:

$$DF(x_0) = \begin{pmatrix}
F & 0 \\
0 & 0
\end{pmatrix}$$

and

$$DV(x_0) = \begin{pmatrix}
V & 0 \\
J_3 & J_4
\end{pmatrix}$$

respectively.

Here, $F$ and $V$ are m × m matrices, defined as $F= \frac{\partial F_i}{\partial x_j}(x_0)$ and $V=\frac{\partial V_i}{\partial x_j}(x_0)$.

Now, the matrix $FV^{-1}$ is known as the next-generation matrix. The basic reproduction number of the model is then given by the eigenvalue of $FV^{-1}$ with the largest absolute value (the spectral radius of $FV^{-1}$). Next generation matrices can be computationally evaluated from observational data, which is often the most productive approach where there are large numbers of compartments.

== See also ==
- Mathematical modelling of infectious disease

== Sources ==
- Ma, Zhien; Li, Jia (2009). Dynamical Modeling and analysis of Epidemics. World Scientific. ISBN 978-981-279-749-0. OCLC 225820441.
- Diekmann, O.; Heesterbeek, J. A. P. (2000). Mathematical Epidemiology of Infectious Disease. John Wiley & Son.
- Heffernan, J. M.; Smith, R. J.; Wahl, L. M. (2005). "Perspectives on the basic reproductive ratio". J. R. Soc. Interface. 2 (4): 281–93. doi:10.1098/rsif.2005.0042. PMC 1578275. PMID 16849186.
