= Basic reproduction number =

Metric in epidemiology

$R_0$ is the average number of people infected from one other person. For example, Ebola has an $R_0$ of two, so on average, a person who has Ebola will pass it on to two other people.

In epidemiology, the basic reproduction number, or basic reproductive number (sometimes called basic reproduction ratio or basic reproductive rate), denoted $R_0$ (pronounced R nought or R zero), of an infection is the expected number of cases directly generated by one case in a population where all individuals are susceptible to infection. The definition assumes that no other individuals are infected or immunized (naturally or through vaccination). Some definitions, such as that of the Australian Department of Health, add the absence of "any deliberate intervention in disease transmission". The basic reproduction number is not necessarily the same as the effective reproduction number $R$ (usually written $R_t$ [t for "time"], sometimes $R_e$), which is the number of cases generated in the current state of a population, which does not have to be the uninfected state. $R_0$ is a dimensionless number (persons infected per person infecting) and not a time rate, which would have units of time^{−1}, or units of time like doubling time.

$R_0$ is not a biological constant for a pathogen as it is also affected by other factors such as environmental conditions and the behaviour of the infected population. $R_0$ values are usually estimated from mathematical models, and the estimated values are dependent on the model used and values of other parameters. Thus values given in the literature only make sense in the given context and it is not recommended to compare values based on different models. $R_0$ does not by itself give an estimate of how fast an infection spreads in the population.

The most important uses of $R_0$ are determining if an emerging infectious disease can spread in a population and determining what proportion of the population should be immunized through vaccination to eradicate a disease. In commonly used infection models, when $R_0 > 1$ the infection will be able to start spreading in a population, but not if $R_0 < 1$. Generally, the larger the value of $R_0$, the harder it is to control the epidemic. For simple models, the proportion of the population that needs to be effectively immunized (meaning not susceptible to infection) to prevent sustained spread of the infection has to be larger than $1 - 1 / R_0$. This is the so-called herd immunity threshold or herd immunity level. Here, herd immunity means that the disease cannot spread in the population because each infected person, on average, can only transmit the infection to less than one other contact. Conversely, the proportion of the population that remains susceptible to infection in the endemic equilibrium is $1 / R_0$. However, this threshold is based on simple models that assume a fully mixed population with no structured relations between the individuals. For example, if there is some correlation between people's immunization (e.g., vaccination) status, then the formula $1 - 1 / R_0$ may underestimate the herd immunity threshold.

Graph of herd immunity threshold vs basic reproduction number with selected diseases

The basic reproduction number is affected by several factors, including the duration of infectivity of affected people, the contagiousness of the microorganism, and the number of susceptible people in the population that the infected people contact.

== History ==
The roots of the basic reproduction concept can be traced through the work of Ronald Ross, Alfred Lotka and others, but its first modern application in epidemiology was by George Macdonald in 1952, who constructed population models of the spread of malaria. In his work he called the quantity basic reproduction rate and denoted it by $Z_0$.

== Overview of R_{0} estimation methods ==
=== Compartmental models ===
Compartmental models are a general modeling technique often applied to the mathematical modeling of infectious diseases. In these models, population members are assigned to 'compartments' with labels – for example, S, I, or R, (Susceptible, Infectious, or Recovered). These models can be used to estimate $R_0$.

=== Epidemic models on networks ===
Epidemics can be modeled as diseases spreading over networks of contact and disease transmission between people. Nodes in these networks represent individuals and links (edges) between nodes represent the contact or disease transmission between them. If such a network is a locally tree-like network, then the basic reproduction can be written in terms of the average excess degree of the transmission network such that:

$$R_0 = \frac{\beta}{\beta+\gamma} \frac{{\langle k^2 \rangle} -{\langle k \rangle}}{{\langle k \rangle}},$$

where ${\beta}$ is the per-edge transmission rate, ${\gamma}$ is the recovery rate, ${\langle k \rangle}$ is the mean-degree (average degree) of the network and ${\langle k^2 \rangle}$ is the second moment of the transmission network degree distribution.

=== Heterogeneous populations ===
In populations that are not homogeneous, the definition of $R_0$ is more subtle. The definition must account for the fact that a typical infected individual may not be an average individual. As an extreme example, consider a population in which a small portion of the individuals mix fully with one another while the remaining individuals are all isolated. A disease may be able to spread in the fully mixed portion even though a randomly selected individual would lead to fewer than one secondary case. This is because the typical infected individual is in the fully mixed portion and thus is able to successfully cause infections. In general, if the individuals infected early in an epidemic are on average either more likely or less likely to transmit the infection than individuals infected late in the epidemic, then the computation of $R_0$ must account for this difference. An appropriate definition for $R_0$ in this case is "the expected number of secondary cases produced, in a completely susceptible population, produced by a typical infected individual".

The basic reproduction number can be computed as a ratio of known rates over time: if a contagious individual contacts $\beta$ other people per unit time, if all of those people are assumed to contract the disease, and if the disease has a mean infectious period of $\dfrac{1}{\gamma}$, then the basic reproduction number is just $R_0 = \dfrac{\beta}{\gamma}$. Some diseases have multiple possible latency periods, in which case the reproduction number for the disease overall is the sum of the reproduction number for each transition time into the disease.

== Effective reproduction number ==
An explanation of the $R$ number in simple terms from the Welsh Government.

In reality, varying proportions of the population are immune to any given disease at any given time. To account for this, the effective reproduction number $R_e$ or $R$ is used. $R_t$ is the average number of new infections caused by a single infected individual at time t in the partially susceptible population. It can be found by multiplying $R_0$ by the fraction S of the population that is susceptible. When the fraction of the population that is immune increases (i. e. the susceptible population S decreases) so much that $R_e$ drops below 1, herd immunity has been achieved and the number of cases occurring in the population will gradually decrease to zero.

== Limitations of R_{0} ==
Use of $R_0$ in the popular press has led to misunderstandings and distortions of its meaning. $R_0$ can be calculated from many different mathematical models and can be calculated from a single model multiple ways. Each of these can give a different estimate of $R_0$, which needs to be interpreted in the context of that model. Therefore, the contagiousness of different infectious agents cannot be compared without recalculating $R_0$ with invariant assumptions. $R_0$ values for past outbreaks might not be valid for current outbreaks of the same disease. Generally speaking, $R_0$ can be used as a threshold, even if calculated with different methods: if $R_0 < 1$, the outbreak will die out, and if $R_0 > 1$, the outbreak will expand. In some cases, for some models, values of $R_0 < 1$ can still lead to self-perpetuating outbreaks. This is particularly problematic if there are intermediate vectors between hosts (as is the case for zoonoses), such as malaria. Therefore, comparisons between values from the "Values of $R_0$ of well-known contagious diseases" table should be conducted with caution.

Although $R_0$ cannot be modified through vaccination or other changes in population susceptibility, it can vary based on a number of biological, sociobehavioral, and environmental factors. It can also be modified by physical distancing and other public policy or social interventions, although some historical definitions exclude any deliberate intervention in reducing disease transmission, including nonpharmacological interventions. And indeed, whether nonpharmacological interventions are included in $R_0$ often depends on the paper, disease, and what if any intervention is being studied. This creates some confusion, because $R_0$ is not a constant; whereas most mathematical parameters with "nought" subscripts are constants.

$R$ depends on many factors, many of which need to be estimated. Each of these factors adds to uncertainty in estimates of $R$. Many of these factors are not important for informing public policy. Therefore, public policy may be better served by metrics similar to $R$, but which are more straightforward to estimate, such as doubling time or half-life ($t_{1/2}$).

Methods used to calculate $R_0$ include the survival function, rearranging the largest eigenvalue of the Jacobian matrix, the next-generation method, calculations from the intrinsic growth rate, existence of the endemic equilibrium, the number of susceptibles at the endemic equilibrium, the average age of infection and the final size equation. Few of these methods agree with one another, even when starting with the same system of differential equations. Even fewer actually calculate the average number of secondary infections. Since $R_0$ is rarely observed in the field and is usually calculated via a mathematical model, this severely limits its usefulness.

== Sample values for various contagious diseases ==
Despite the difficulties in estimating $R_0$mentioned in the previous section, estimates have been made for a number of genera, and are shown in this table. Each genus may be composed of many species, strains, or variants. Estimations of $R_0$ for species, strains, and variants are typically less accurate than for genera, and so are provided in separate tables below for diseases of particular interest (influenza and COVID-19).

Values of R_{0} and herd immunity thresholds (HITs) of contagious diseases prior to intervention
Disease	Transmission	R_{0}	HIT (Note: Calculated using p = 1 − 1/R_{0}.)
Measles	Aerosol	12–18	92–94%
Pertussis	Aerosol and respiratory droplets	12–17	92–94%
COVID-19 (see values for specific strains below)	Respiratory droplets and aerosol	2.9–20	65–95%
Chickenpox (Varicella)	Aerosol	10–12	90–92%
Mumps	Respiratory droplets	10–12	90–92%
Tuberculosis	Aerosol	0.57-10	0–90%
Norovirus	Fecal–oral route and aerosol	7.2 (2.1–14)	86% (52–93%)
Rubella	Respiratory droplets	6–7 (Note: From a module of a training course with data modified from other sources.)	83–86%
Polio	Fecal–oral route	5–7	80–86%
Smallpox	Respiratory droplets	3.5–6.0	71–83%
HIV/AIDS	Body fluids	2–5	50–80%
SARS	Respiratory droplets	2–4	50–75%
Diphtheria	Saliva	2.6 (1.7–4.3)	62% (41–77%)
Common cold (e.g., rhinovirus)	Respiratory droplets	2–3	50–67%
Mpox	Physical contact, body fluids, respiratory droplets, sexual (MSM)	2.1 (1.1–2.7)	53% (22–63%)
Ebola (2014 outbreak)	Body fluids	1.8 (1.4–1.8)	44% (31–44%)
Influenza (seasonal strains)	Respiratory droplets	1.3 (1.2–1.4)	23% (17–29%)
Andes hantavirus	Respiratory droplets and body fluids	2.1 (1.2–3.4)	16% (0–36%) (Note: When R_{0} < 1.0, the disease naturally disappears.)
Nipah virus	Body fluids	0.5	0%
MERS	Respiratory droplets	0.5 (0.3–0.8)	0%

Estimates for strains of influenza.

Values of R_{0} and herd immunity thresholds (HITs) for specific influenza strains
Disease	Transmission	R_{0}	HIT
Influenza (1918 pandemic strain)	Respiratory droplets	2	50%
Influenza (2009 pandemic strain)	Respiratory droplets	1.6 (1.3–2.0)	37% (25–51%)
Influenza (seasonal strains)	Respiratory droplets	1.3 (1.2–1.4)	23% (17–29%)

Estimates for variants of SARS-CoV-2.

Values of R_{0} and herd immunity thresholds (HITs) for variants of SARS-CoV-2
Disease	Transmission	R_{0}	HIT
COVID-19 (Post-Omicron BA.4/5)	Respiratory droplets and aerosol	~20	95%
COVID-19 (Omicron variant)	Respiratory droplets and aerosol	9.5	89%
COVID-19 (Delta variant)	Respiratory droplets and aerosol	5.1	80%
COVID-19 (Alpha variant)	Respiratory droplets and aerosol	3.8–5	74–80%
COVID-19 (ancestral strain)	Respiratory droplets and aerosol	2.9 (2.4–3.4)	65% (58–71%)

== In popular culture ==
In the 2011 film Contagion, a fictional medical disaster thriller, an epidemiologist explains the concept of $R_0$.

== See also ==
- Apparent infection rate
- Compartmental models in epidemiology
- E-epidemiology
- Epi Info software program
- Epidemiological method
- Epidemiological transition
- Mathematical modelling of infectious disease
