= Susceptible individual =

Member of a population who is at risk of becoming infected by a disease

In epidemiology a susceptible individual (sometimes known simply as a susceptible) is a member of a population who is at risk of becoming infected by a disease.

== Susceptible individuals ==
Susceptibles have been exposed to neither the wild strain of the disease nor a vaccination against it, and thus have not developed immunity. Those individuals who have antibodies against an antigen associated with a particular infectious disease will not be susceptible, even if they did not produce the antibody themselves (for example, infants younger than six months who still have maternal antibodies passed through the placenta and from the colostrum, and adults who have had a recent injection of antibodies). However, these individuals soon return to the susceptible state as the antibodies are broken down.

Some individuals may have a natural resistance to a particular infectious disease. However, except in some special cases such as malaria, these individuals make up such a small proportion of the total population that they can be ignored for the purposes of modelling an epidemic.

== Mathematical model of susceptibility ==
The proportion of the population who are susceptible to a particular disease is denoted S. Due to the problems mentioned above, it is difficult to know this parameter for a given population. However, in a population with a rectangular population distribution (such as that of a developed country), it may be estimated by:

$${S} = \frac {A} {L}$$

Where A is the average age at which the disease is contracted and L is the life expectancy of the population. To understand the rationale behind this relation, think of A as the length/amount of time spent in the susceptible group (assuming an individual is susceptible before contracting the disease and immune afterwards) and L as the total length of time spent in the population. It thus follows that the proportion of time spent as a susceptible is A/L and, in a population with a rectangular distribution, the proportion of an individual's life spent in one group is representative of the proportion of the population in that group.

The advantage of estimating S in this way is that both the average age of infection and life expectancy will be well documented, and thus the other parameters needed to calculate S will be easily at hand.

The parameter S is important in the mathematical modelling of epidemics.

== Susceptibility in virology ==
Viruses are only able to cause disease or pathologies if they meet several criteria:

1. The virus is able to enter the cell (called a susceptible state)
2. There is a sufficient number of viruses within the cell
3. The virus is able to replicate within the cell (called a permissive state)

Hence susceptibility only refers to the fact that the virus is able to get into the cell, via having the proper receptor(s), and as a result, despite the fact that a host may be susceptible, the virus may still not be able to cause any pathologies within the host. Reasons for this are varied and may include suppression by the host immune system, or abortive measures taken by intrinsic cell defenses.

== See also ==
- Mathematical modelling in epidemiology
- Immunity (medical)
- Immune system
- Immunization
- Bugchasing and giftgiving
