= Outline of infectious disease concepts =

Infectious disease = Invasion of an organism's body by pathogenic agents

The following outline is provided as an overview of and topical guide to concepts related to infectious diseases in humans.

Infection – Subsequent to their transmission via environment and evasion or overcoming of defense, the entry/invasion, establishment, and replication of disease-causing microscopic organisms (pathogens or agents) inside a host organism, and the reaction of host tissues to them and to the toxins they produce.

Infectious disease – illness or disorder when pathogenic (disease-causing) microorganisms, such as bacteria, viruses, fungi, or parasites invade and multiply within the body of a host organism and release toxins, causing various clinical symptoms which can potentially lead to severe health complications or even death. Infectious diseases can be spread, directly or indirectly, from person to person, from animal to animal, or from animals to humans (zoonotic diseases), or through environmental exposure. They can be treated with medical interventions or prevented before they happen.

== Determinants ==
=== Agent ===
Infectious agent (also known as pathogen) – a biological entity (microscopic or macroscopic) that causes disease or illness in its host by invading and multiplying within the host's body, disrupting its normal physiological functions and leading to clinical symptoms (i.e. an infectious disease).

- Biofilm – sticky microbial communities adhering to surfaces, facilitating bacterial survival and resistance to treatments.
- Germ theory of disease – paradigm that microorganisms are the principal causative agents of infectious diseases.
- Infectivity – ability of a pathogen to establish itself and cause infection in a susceptible host
  - Infectious dose - quantity of pathogen required to cause infection in a host organism.
- Pathogenicity – ability of a pathogenic microorganism to cause disease in a host organism.
  - Attack rate – proportion of a population of susceptible individuals who get infected and develop illness during an outbreak over a certain period of time.
- Quorum sensing – Cell-to-cell communication system used by some pathogenic bacteria, potentially triggering virulence factor production.
- Virulence – degree of pathogenicity, measured by the severity of an infectious disease based on damage caused and the host's immune response.
  - Endotoxin – toxin released from the outer membrane of certain gram-negative bacteria, triggering inflammation.
  - Exotoxin – toxin secreted by bacteria into the surrounding environment (damaging host tissue)
  - Case fatality rate – proportion (percentage) of individuals diagnosed with a specific infectious disease who die from it.
  - Virulence factors – molecule or characteristic possessed or structure produced by pathogens that increase their ability to cause disease in a host organism.
- Antimicrobial resistance (including antibiotic resistance) - ability of microorganisms to resist the effects of medications designed to kill or inactivate them.
  - Drug resistance – reduction in effectiveness of a medication such as an antimicrobial or an antineoplastic in treating a disease.
  - Horizontal gene transfer - Transfer of genetic material between different organisms of the same generation, allowing them to acquire new traits, including resistance to antibiotics.
  - Multidrug-resistant bacteria/Superbug - bacteria resistant to multiple classes of antibiotics, with limited treatment options.
- Host tropism – preference of a pathogen for a particular host species, cell type, or tissue.
- Pathogenesis – process by which a disease or disorder develops, including factors which contribute to its onset, progression and maintenance.

==== Pathogens and related disciplines ====
There are mainly seven types of pathogenic microorganisms: viruses, bacteria, fungi, protozoa, helminths, other parasites and abnormal proteins called prions.

- Bacteria – microscopic single-celled organisms lacking a nucleus, some of which can cause infections in humans.
  - Bacterial diseases – diseases caused by bacteria.
  - Bacteriology – study of bacteria, their characteristics, growth, and role in infectious diseases.
- Viruses - microscopic pathogens consisting of genetic material surrounded by a protein coat, requiring living cells of host organisms to replicate.
  - Viral disease – diseases caused by viruses.
  - Virology – study of viruses, their structure, replication, and role in viral diseases.
  - Subviral agent – smaller than viruses and have only some of their properties.
    - Viroid – small single-stranded, circular RNAs that are infectious pathogens.
    - Satellite virus – subviral agent that depends on the coinfection of a host cell with a helper virus for its replication.
- Prions – infectious agents composed solely of misfolded proteins, causing neurodegenerative disorders.
  - Prion diseases – progressive, incurable, and fatal neurodegenerative diseases associated with prions, affecting humans and animals.
- Fungi – eukaryotic spore-forming organisms distinct from plants, animals, and bacteria including single-cell yeasts and multi-cell molds, some of which can cause infections in humans.
  - Fungal infection/Mycosis/Fungal disease – infection (and infectious disease) caused by fungi.
  - Mycology – study of fungi, their growth, and their role in fungal infections.
- Parasite - organism benefitting at the cost of a host organism.
  - Parasitic disease
  - Parasitology – study of parasites, their life cycles, and the diseases they cause in humans and animals.
  - Protozoa – single-celled eukaryotic organisms that can live as parasites within a host.
    - Protozoan infection
  - Helminths – macroscopic parasitic worms that can live in different organs and tissues of their host
    - Helminthiasis/Worm infection – - parasitic worm infections caused by various helminths (i.e. roundworms, tapeworms, and flukes) residing in different organs and tissues, causing discomfort, nutritional deficiencies, and potentially organ damage.
  - Infestation - overgrowth of parasites (like lice, mites, or worms) on or within a host, often causing irritation, discomfort, and potential secondary infections due to scratching or burrowing.
- Insect vectors - usually an arthropod such as flea, tick or mosquito carrying a pathogen from one host to another.
  - List of insect-borne diseases
  - Medical entomology – study of insects and arthropods that impact human health by acting as vectors for infectious diseases.

=== Host ===
Host – a living organism, typically a human or animal, that harbors a pathogenic microorganism, providing the environment and resources necessary for it to survive, grow, and potentially reproduce or multiply. There is a symbiotic relationship between the two organisms, which can be commensal (mutually beneficial), but in the case of infectious diseases, harmful for the host.

- Burn – causing damage to the skin and underlying tissues, compromising the body's primary defense barrier and increasing susceptibility to infections.
- Comorbidity – presence of one or more additional medical conditions that can increase susceptibility to infections.
- Diabetes – Diabetes impairs immune function and causes poor circulation, increasing susceptibility to infections and complicating healing.
- Endogenization – A pathogen becoming fixed into a host's germline, enabling vertical transmission.
- Host–pathogen interaction – host's immune defenses and the pathogen's strategies to invade and survive, determining the outcome and severity of infections
- Immune response – body's defense mechanism to recognize, fight, and eliminate pathogens, which influences the susceptibility, severity, and resolution of infections.
  - Immunodeficiency – weakened or compromised immune system that reduces the body's ability to effectively fight off pathogens, leading to increased susceptibility and severity of infections.
  - Immunosuppression – deliberate reduction or impairment of the immune system's function due to medical treatments or conditions, causing increased vulnerability to infections.
  - Immunopathology – study of how a host's immune response can sometimes cause disease or tissue damage.
  - Cytokine storm – pathological reaction in humans and other animals in which the innate immune system causes an uncontrolled and excessive release of pro-inflammatory signaling molecules called cytokines.
- Microbiome health – balance and diversity of the microbial communities in the body, influencing the immune response and overall susceptibility to infections.
- Opportunistic infection – infection caused by pathogens that take advantage of a weakened or compromised immune system.
- Risk of infection – Likelihood of contracting an infection, which is influenced by a host's inherent susceptibility (age, immune status, genetics) or external exposures (behavior, environment).
- Susceptible individual – individual lacking immunity and at risk of infection by a specific pathogen.
  - Age (Immunosenescence) – age-related decline in the immune system's function, making older adults more susceptible to infections.
  - Sex/Gender – susceptibility to infection due to hormonal differences, immunological variations and differences in behavioral patterns between males and females.
  - Nutrition status – nutrient and micronutrient deficiencies increases susceptibility to infections.
  - Vaccination status – vaccination can lower the risk of infection by preparing the immune system to recognize and efficiently combat specific pathogens.
  - Genetic predisposition – Variations in immune Genes, susceptibility genes and major histocompatibility complex (MHC) genes and genetic predisposition to certain chronic inflammatory disease, contributing to weakening of the immune system.
    - Immunogenetics – field investigating the complex interplay between genes and the immune system affecting infection risk.
  - Behavioral/lifestyle factors
    - Smoking – weakens the immune system and damages lung tissue, making individuals more susceptible to respiratory infections.
    - Sleep deprivation – weakens the immune system's ability to fight off pathogens.
    - Poor oral hygiene – creates a reservoir for bacteria that can potentially enter the bloodstream and cause infections elsewhere in the body.
    - Physical inactivity – weakens immune function, reduces lung capacity, increases risk of chronic diseases and reduces blood flow, making a person more susceptible to infections.
    - Substance abuse – Drug and alcohol use can impair the immune system and increase susceptibility to infections.
    - Unprotected/unsafe sex – increases the risk of contracting sexually transmitted infections.
  - Pregnancy – physiological changes, hormonal changes and immunological changes occurring in the mother's body and not meeting the nutritional demands can lead to infections.
  - Stress levels – Chronic stress can suppress the immune system, potentially making the body more vulnerable to infection.

=== Environment ===
Environment – the external conditions and factors such as climate, sanitation, human behavior and living conditions that influence the spread, survival, and transmission of pathogens and the risk of infectious diseases.

- Access to water and sanitation – Access to clean, safe water and proper sanitation facilities for waste disposal (toilets, latrines) are crucial to prevent waterborne and fecal-oral transmission of pathogens.
- Air quality – poor air quality with high levels of particulate matter (PM) can irritate the respiratory tract and potentially increase susceptibility to respiratory infections; chronic inflammation caused by exposure to pollutants weaken the immune system.
- Biodiversity loss – disrupts the natural balance that can keep pathogen populations in check, force wildlife into closer contact with humans and domestic animals leading to zoonosis, eliminate reservoir hosts leading to the emergence of new pathogens in the remaining wildlife populations and forcing the pathogen to seek new hosts, including humans.
- Climate change – expands the geographic range of insect vectors, favors the survival and reproduction of some pathogens, disrupts ecosystems, worsens existing health problems, etc. impacting in complex ways and making people more susceptible to infections.
- Climate zones
  - El Niño – alters weather patterns, potentially increasing the spread of vector-borne (e.g., dengue) and waterborne (e.g., cholera) diseases.
  - Tropical diseases – tropical regions have humid and warm climates which create favorable conditions for the spread of vector-borne diseases like malaria and dengue.
- Commerce – facilitates the global movement of pathogens through trade and transportation.
- Deforestation – disrupts ecosystems and habitats, increasing human exposure to zoonotic diseases.
- Ecology – Changes in ecosystems, like habitat fragmentation, climate change and biodiversity loss, can shift disease dynamics and increase spillover of pathogens to humans
- Humidity – promotes the survival and reproduction of disease vectors (e.g., mosquitoes) and fungi (e.g., histoplasmosis).
- Injection drug use – increases transmission of bloodborne infections like HIV and hepatitis.
- Natural disaster
  - Flood – creates breeding grounds for waterborne (e.g., leptospirosis) and vector-borne (e.g., malaria) diseases.
- Poultry and livestock – Serve as reservoirs for zoonotic diseases, such as avian flu and brucellosis.
- Poverty – limits access to healthcare and sanitation, increasing vulnerability to infectious diseases. (e.g., TB, cholera).
- Travel – accelerates the global spread of infectious diseases through human movement.
- Urbanization – increases population density, facilitating disease transmission (e.g., TB, influenza) and straining healthcare systems.
- Vector control – Vector control, such as insecticide use and habitat modification, reduce the spread of vector-borne diseases
- War and conflict – disrupts healthcare systems and sanitation, leading to disease outbreaks and displacement-related infections.

== Transmission ==
Transmission – the process by which an infectious agent is spread from one host (an infected person) or environment (a reservoir) to another susceptible host person, facilitating the spread of disease.

=== Basic concepts ===
- Asymptomatic carrier – individual harboring a pathogen without showing symptoms (subclinical infection) and still capable of transmitting it to others.
- Chain of infection – sequential steps or process required for an infectious agent to pass from a source host to a susceptible host.
- Fomite – inanimate object contaminated with infectious agents facilitating their transmission between individuals/hosts.
- Host – organism providing shelter and sustenance to a pathogen, helping to survive and potentially replicate to cause health problems.
- Incubation period – time interval between exposure to a pathogen and the onset of clinical symptoms.
- Index case/Patient zero – first identified case in an outbreak investigation, serving as a guide to public health interventions.
- Infectious period – time interval during which an infected individual can transmit the pathogen to other susceptible hosts.
- Latent period – time interval between exposure to a pathogen and when the individual/host becomes infectious, capable of transmitting pathogens.
- Natural reservoir – animal population or environment in which a pathogen normally lives and multiplies and can be transmitted directly or indirectly to humans.
- Opportunistic infection – infection caused by otherwise harmless organisms, taking advantage of a weakened immune system, thus becoming pathogens.
- Silent/Subclinical/Asymptomatic infection – infection with no apparent noticeable signs or symptoms but still capable of spreading, possibly due to a weak immune response or the nature of the pathogen.
- Superinfection – secondary infection occurring on top of a pre-existing one, often with a different pathogen and potentially leading to complex clinical presentations and treatment challenges.
- Super-spreader – infected individual transmitting a pathogen to a disproportionately large number of others (secondary cases) compared to others in an outbreak.
- Transmission Heterogeneity – disproportionate fraction of pathogen transmission events resulting from a small number of individuals or geographic locations.
- Viral load – quantity of viral particles in a given volume of (typically per milliliter of) a patient's blood or other body fluids.
- Window period – time interval between exposure to an infection and the reliable detection (by a diagnostic test) of the presence of the pathogen or its specific antibodies in the body.

=== Modes ===
Transmission mode – the mechanism through which an infectious agent travels from a source (an infected host or a reservoir) to a new susceptible host.

==== Endogenous ====
Endogenous transmission – the spread of infectious agents within a single host organism, typically from their normal habitat in one part of the body to a new location within the body, rather than between individuals.

- Endogenization – the evolutionary process by which viral genetic material becomes stably integrated into the germline of a host organism and inherited by offspring through Mendelian inheritance.
- Endogenous overgrowth – Overproliferation of the body's normal microbiota due to disruptions (e.g., antibiotics, immunosuppression), leading to infections (e.g., Clostridioides difficile colitis).
- Normal flora overgrowth – Disruption of the normal microbial balance leading to excessive growth of normally harmless commensal microorganisms in their native environment, causing opportunistic infections (e.g., bacterial vaginosis).
- Endogenous reactivation – Re-emergence of dormant pathogens due to immune suppression or stress (e.g., reactivation of latent tuberculosis or herpes viruses).
- Microbial translocation – Movement of microbes or their products (e.g., endotoxins) from the gut lumen into systemic circulation, often due to gut barrier dysfunction / permeability (e.g., in sepsis or liver cirrhosis).
- Endogenous seeding – Spread of pathogens from a primary site of infection to distant sites via the bloodstream or lymphatic system, leading to secondary infections (e.g., Staphylococcus aureus bacteremia causing metastatic abscesses).
- Biofilm formation – Microbes form protective, adherent communities on surfaces (e.g., catheters or tissues), enhancing resistance to antibiotics and immune responses, making infections chronic and difficult to treat (e.g., Pseudomonas aeruginosa in cystic fibrosis)

==== Exogenous ====
Exogenous transmission – the transfer and spread of infectious agents between different individuals or from an external source to a host organism.

===== Cross-species =====
Cross-species transmission (or host jump) – the transmission of infectious agents from one species (original animal reservoir) to a new one, potentially leading to infections in the recipient species.

- Spillover infection – cross-species transmission of pathogens from a domestic or wildlife animal reservoir to a new human host.
- Vector – organism, typically an insect or arachnid, that transmits pathogens from an infected host to a susceptible host individual.
- Zoonosis – infectious disease transmissible from animals to humans.
- Reverse zoonosis – transmission of pathogens from humans to infect animals.

===== Human-to-human / Cross-infection =====
Human-to-human transmission (also known as cross-infection) – direct or indirect transmission of infectious agents from one individual to another, leading to the spread of disease within a population.

- Contagious disease – Infectious disease readily spread by pathogen transmission
  - Contagion – disease-causing infectious agent spread by direct or indirect contact.
- Source
  - Community-acquired
  - Nosocomial/Hospital-acquired infection – An infection occurring in a patient within a hospital or a healthcare in a hospital or other healthcare facility, which was not present or incubating at the time of admission, and often associated with invasive procedures or compromised immune states.
  - Iatrogenic/Medical care – Causation of harm by any medical activity
- Generational difference
  - Vertical/Congenital – Infection caused by pathogens that use mother-to-children transmission
    - Prenatal
    - Perinatal
    - Neonatal – Human disease
  - Horizontal
  - Mixed-mode
- Breakthrough infection – Infection following vaccine administration

===== Environment-to-human =====
- Sapronosis

===== Routes =====
Routes of transmission – specific pathways through taken by infectious agents to travel from one infected host or reservoir to a new host.

Respiratory

- Airborne disease
- Bioaerosol/aerosol
  - Aerosol-generating procedure
- Dental aerosol
- Respiratory droplet - small droplet >5 μm in diameter, e.g. a moisture particle released during coughing, sneezing, or speaking.

Linked to Vascular system (Blood vessels)

- Blood-borne disease
- Percutaneous inoculation
  - Injection site
  - Intravenous line
  - Insect bite
  - Animal bite
- Surgical intervention
  - Postoperative wound
  - Surgical site infection
- Vector-borne
  - Mosquito
  - Tick

Gastrointestinal (Alimentary canal)

- Food
  - Contamination
- Breastmilk
- Water
- Feces

Cutaneous (Skin)

- Burn
- Fomite
- Soil
- Open wound

Genitourinary

- Sex

Trans-placental

- Prenatal

Cervico-vaginal

- Perinatal

Other

- Ocular (Eye) mucosal membrane

=== Modelling ===
Mathematical modelling of infectious disease – mathematical equations, tools and simulations to represent the dynamics of disease transmission within a population in order to understand and predict them for disease control and public health decision-making.

- Agent-based model – Simulation of individual agent (human or animal) behavior and interactions within a defined environment to understand disease spread dynamics.
- Animal disease model – Mathematical model used in veterinary epidemiology to understand zoonotic disease spreading dynamics in animal populations and predict zoonotic spillover (animal to human transmission).
- Attack rate – proportion of a population of susceptible individuals who get infected and develop illness during an outbreak over a certain period of time.
- Basic reproduction number – Average expected number of secondary cases infected by a single primary case in a completely susceptible population, useful for assessing epidemic potential.
- Compartmental models in epidemiology – Mathematical models that group individuals of a population into compartments based on infection status (such as susceptible, infected, recovered) to simulate disease dynamics and transmission patterns over time.
- Critical community size – Minimum population size needed for a disease to persist indefinitely within a community without new introductions, influenced by factors like transmission dynamics and immunity.
- Force of infection – Rate at which susceptible individuals acquire infection from infectious individuals, used to model incidence rate (number of infected individuals) and transmission dynamics.
- Herd immunity – Indirect protection of susceptible individuals from infectious diseases when a large proportion of a population becomes immune, either through vaccination or prior infection, reducing overall transmission risk.
- Infection rate – Rate at which new infections occur within susceptible individuals over a defined period.
- Machine learning – techniques enabling computers to analyze large datasets and identify patterns in disease spread, thus learning to forecast and detect disease outbreak and improve response strategies.
- Multiplicity of infection – Number of different pathogen strains (viral particles/genomes) infecting a single host at the same time, influencing disease severity, transmission dynamics, and evolutionary pathways.
- Serial interval – Time between symptom onset in a primary case and symptom onset in a secondary case infected by the primary case, useful for understanding disease spread patterns and assessing control measures.
- WAIFW matrix – (Who acquires infection from Whom, At what rate, For how long, and With what consequences) mathematical framework/matrix to quantify and summarize key transmission parameters for a disease, such as contact rates and probabilities of infection.

=== Occurrence in population ===
- Disease cluster – grouping of cases of a disease occurring closely in a specific time and place, suggesting possible local transmission.
- Endemic – constant presence of a disease within a specific geographic area or population at a predictable baseline level.
- Epidemic – sudden, unexpected increase in the number of cases of a disease in a specific population and geographic area.
  - Epidemic curve – graphical representation of the rise, peak, and decline of the number of cases of an epidemic disease over time.
  - Farr's laws – principles describing the relationship between population density, poverty, and the occurrence of infectious diseases.
  - Virgin-soil epidemic – an epidemic in which populations that previously were in isolation from a pathogen are immunologically unprepared upon contact with the novel pathogen.
- Holoendemic – highly prevalent and constantly present disease occurrence in a population or geographic area, affecting most individuals from an early age.
- Hyperendemic – consistently and persistently high incidence and/or prevalence of disease occurrence within a particular population or geographic area, equally affecting all age groups.
- Incidence – rate of new cases of a disease occurring in a specific population within a defined time period, typically expressed per 1,000 or 100,000 individuals.
- Inequality in disease – disparities in the burden (distribution and impact) of infectious diseases among different population groups, often due to social determinants of health.
- Mesoendemic – moderate level of constant disease prevalence within a specific geographic area or population.
- Disease outbreak – sudden unexpected increase in the occurrence of the cases of a particular disease cases for a given time period and a specific geographical area.
- Pandemic – widespread epidemic, often affecting multiple countries or continents and involving a large number of people.
- Prevalence – proportion of individuals in a population affected by a disease at a specific point in time.
- Seasonality – fluctuation in disease occurrence in different seasons or times of the year, often linked to environmental factors.
- Social epidemiology – branch of epidemiology concerned with the way that social structures, institutions, relationships and other social factors influence health and disease patterns in a population.
- Geographic distribution – spatial pattern of how disease cases are located and spread across different regions.
- Sporadic – scattered, irregular occurrence of disease cases without any recognizable pattern in space and time, often without any common source of infection.
- Syndemic – co-occurrence and interaction of two or more diseases or health conditions in individuals or a population, exacerbating their negative health outcomes.
- Twindemic – simultaneous occurrence of two epidemics, where two infectious diseases concurrently circulate in a population, potentially straining public health resources and increasing healthcare burden.

== Anatomical location ==
The specific area or organ within the body where pathogenic microorganisms invade and proliferate, leading to localized or systemic disease.

- Respiratory
  - Ear-Nose-Throat/Upper respiratory tract – Infection of the nose, sinuses, pharynx, larynx or trachea
  - Chest/Lower respiratory tract – Medical term
- Gastrointestinal – Illnesses of the digestive system
  - Intestinal
- Genitourinary/Urogenital disease - infection of organs involved in the excretion of fluids and reproduction.
- Nervous system
- Skin/Cutaneous – Infections of the skin
- Soft tissue
- Bone – Infection of the bones
- Joint – Inflammation of a joint due to infection
- Cardiovascular
- Systemic/Generalized – Condition which affects multiple organs or the whole body
- Blood – Life-threatening response to infection
- Tooth – Infection originating in a tooth
- Mouth – Group of infections occurring around the oral cavity
- Fetus
- Eye

== Diagnostics ==
Diagnostics – methods, procedures, tests and practices used in the process of identifying the presence and cause of an infectious disease in a patient, through laboratory or point-of-care detection of the pathogen itself or of the host's immune response to it, informing subsequent clinical management and infection control decisions.

=== Direct detection methods ===
Laboratory or point-of-care approaches that identify a pathogen itself, or a component of it, directly in a patient specimen.

- Microscopy – visual examination of a specimen under magnification to identify pathogens by morphology or characteristic pathological changes associated with infection, often using staining techniques that enhance visibility or distinguish organisms.
  - Histopathology – microscopic examination of tissue to identify pathological changes associated with infection, including characteristic inflammatory patterns or visible microorganisms.
  - Cytopathology/Smear test – Examination of cells, microorganisms, or other material spread or smeared as a thin layer across a glass microscope slide, often followed by staining.
  - Staining – application of dyes or other labeling agents to a clinical specimen to increase the visibility of microorganisms or cellular structures under a microscope and, in some methods, to distinguish them based on their structural or chemical properties.
    - Gram stain – staining technique that classifies bacteria as Gram-positive or Gram-negative based on differences in cell envelope structure, commonly providing rapid information that can help guide initial antimicrobial therapy.
    - Ziehl–Neelsen stain/Acid-fast stain – staining technique used to identify acid-fast bacteria, notably Mycobacterium species, which resist decolorization because of their lipid-rich cell envelope.
- Microbiological culture – isolation and growth of a microorganism from a clinical specimen for identification and further laboratory testing.
  - Antimicrobial susceptibility testing – testing of a cultured isolate to determine which antimicrobial agents are active against it, guiding treatment selection.
- Molecular diagnostics – detection of a pathogen's genetic material in a clinical specimen to diagnose infection, often providing more rapid results than culture.
  - Nucleic acid amplification tests (NAATs) – techniques that amplify and detect small quantities of a pathogen's DNA or RNA, enabling rapid and highly sensitive diagnosis.
    - Polymerase chain reaction (PCR) – a widely used NAAT, amplifying specific DNA sequences through repeated cycles of denaturation, primer annealing, and enzymatic extension to enable detection of minute quantities of pathogen genetic material.
  - Genomic sequencing – determination of all or part of a pathogen's genome, used for identification, characterization, transmission analysis, and detection of genetic determinants such as antimicrobial-resistance mutations.
- Antigen testing/Enzyme-linked immunosorbent assay (ELISA) – detection of pathogen-specific antigens in a clinical specimen using immunological assays.
  - Rapid antigen test – point-of-care antigen assay producing results within minutes, generally trading some sensitivity for speed compared with molecular methods.

=== Indirect detection methods ===
Approaches that infer infection from the host's immune response rather than detecting the pathogen directly.

- Serology – testing of blood serum for antibodies or other serological markers associated with infection, used to investigate current or previous exposure to a pathogen.
  - Antibody testing (IgM/IgG) – detection of pathogen-specific antibodies; interpretation of IgM and IgG patterns depends on the pathogen, timing of infection, vaccination history, and clinical context.
    - Antibody immunoassay – immunoassay used to detect or measure antibodies directed at a pathogen.
    - Antibody titer – measurement the level or concentration of pathogen-specific antibodies.
  - Seroconversion – development of detectable antibodies against a pathogen following infection or vaccination, marking the transition from a seronegative to seropositive state.

=== Diagnostic stewardship ===
Diagnostic stewardship – coordinated efforts to improve the appropriate use of diagnostic testing for infectious disease, ensuring the right test is ordered for the right patient at the right time to guide treatment and reduce unnecessary antimicrobial use; distinct from antimicrobial stewardship, which governs the appropriate use of treatment rather than testing.

=== Other related concepts ===
- Sensitivity and specificity – measures of a diagnostic test's ability to correctly identify patients with and without a disease
- Positive predictive value – proportion of positive test results that correctly indicate the presence of a disease
- Negative predictive value – proportion of negative test results that correctly indicate the absence of a disease
- Point-of-care testing – diagnostic testing performed near or at the site of patient care
- Differential diagnosis – process of distinguishing among possible causes of a patient's signs and symptoms
- Biomarker – measurable biological characteristic used as an indicator of a physiological or pathological process
- Screening – testing people without symptoms to identify possible disease at an early stage

== Prevention and control measures ==
Infection prevention and control – strategies, measures and practices designed and implemented to prevent the spread of infectious diseases within healthcare settings and communities, reducing the risk of infections among patients, healthcare workers, and the general population.

=== Pharmaceutical ===
Pharmaceutical prevention and control – Use of medications, vaccines, and other pharmaceutical interventions to prevent the spread of infectious diseases, treat infected individuals, and manage outbreaks within populations.

- Antibiotic – medication used to prevent and treat bacterial infections by killing or inhibiting bacteria.
  - prophylactic antibiotic – administration of antibiotics to an uninfected individual to prevent the development of an infection, typically before a surgical procedure or in individuals at high risk of infection
- Antifungal – medication used to treat fungal infections.
- Anthelmintic – medication used to treat parasitic worm infections.
  - Ascaricide – medication used to specifically treat roundworms.
- Antimicrobial – substance that kills, reduces or inhibits the growth of microorganisms.
  - Antimicrobial stewardship – strategies to ensure appropriate and effective use of antimicrobial agents to prevent microbial resistance.
- Antiseptic – Chemical substance applied to skin or surface to reduce pathogens and prevent infection, but not strong enough to sterilize.
- Antiviral – Medication to treat or prevent viral infections.
- Asepsis – Techniques and practices to prevent contamination in healthcare settings and maintain sterility.
- Combination therapy – use of multiple medications (multiple active ingredients) simultaneously to treat a single disease, enhancing therapeutic efficacy and reducing the risk of drug resistance.
- Pharmacovigilance / Drug safety - science and activities involved in the monitoring, detection, assessment, understanding, and prevention of adverse effects or any other drug-related problems to secure their safety and ensure that potential benefits outweigh the risks.
- Immunization – process of strengthening immune response and increase protection against infectious diseases by receiving vaccines.
- Immunotherapy – treatment boosting the body's immune response against disease.
  - Monoclonal antibody therapy – targeted treatment using engineered antibodies produced by identical immune cells to fight pathogens.
- Inoculation – introduction of a pathogen or antigen into the body to stimulate immunity.
- Phage therapy – treatment using bacteriophage viruses that infect and kill bacteria to combat bacterial infections.
- Pre-exposure prophylaxis – taking medication taken before potential exposure to prevent infectious disease.
- Post-exposure prophylaxis – taking medication taken after potential exposure to prevent infectious disease.
- Drug repositioning – use of existing medications for new indications or purposes not initially intended, including treating infections.
- Vaccine – biological preparation (usually containing weakened or inactive pathogens) to stimulate the immune system to fight against future infection.
  - Vaccination – administration of a vaccine to stimulate the immune system and prevent future infection.
  - Vaccine efficacy/effectiveness - measurement of the ability of a vaccine to produce desired outcome (protection of individuals or populations from a specific disease) in controlled conditions/real-world settings.
  - Booster dose – additional dose of a vaccine to enhance or prolong immunity or to strengthen waning immunity.
  - Vaccine resistance – ability of a pathogen to evade the protective effects of a vaccine, potentially leading to breakthrough infections.
  - Vaccine hesitancy – delay in acceptance, or refusal of vaccines despite availability and supporting evidence.
  - Vaccine-preventable disease – disease preventable by vaccination.
  - Ring vaccination – strategy of targeted vaccination of close contacts of infected individuals to prevent further spread and control outbreaks.

=== Non-pharmaceutical ===
Non-pharmaceutical intervention – strategies and measures implemented to stop the spread of infection without relying on medication or pharmaceutical products.

- Contact tracing – systematically identifying, assessing and managing individuals potentially exposed to infectious disease through contact with an infected person, in order to monitor and interrupt transmission chains.
- Cordon sanitaire – Emergency quarantine measure restricting movement into and out of a defined geographic area to contain the spread of infectious diseases.
- Disease surveillance – Continuous, systematic monitoring, collection, analysis, and interpretation of disease-related data to identify trends and inform public health interventions.
- Disinfection – use of germicidal chemical agents or physical methods to inactivate, eliminate or reduce harmful microbes on surfaces of inanimate objects, preventing further transmission.
- Flattening the curve – public health strategy aimed at slowing the spread of an infectious disease over time to reduce the peak number of cases, thus mitigating strain on healthcare systems so that they are not overwhelmed.
- Hygiene – practices that promote cleanliness and other sanitary measures to prevent the spread of pathogens.
  - Food hygiene – scientific principles and practices related to the handling, preparation, and storage of food to ensure food safety and minimize foodborne illness risk.
  - Hand washing – cleaning hands with soap and water or hand sanitizer to remove dirt, germs, and other contaminants to prevent or reduce infectious disease transmission.
  - Gloves – Disposable protection worn on hands during medical examinations and procedures to protect both the patient and healthcare provider from cross-contamination and infection by providing a physical barrier for hands, minimizing contact with infectious material.
- Isolation – separation of individuals infected with a contagious disease from healthy populations to prevent infectious disease spread.
  - Barrier nursing – outdated term referring to nursing practices that create a barrier between infectious patients and other patients or healthcare workers to prevent infection spread.
- Stay-at-home order/Lockdown – restriction on population movement requiring individuals to remain at home except for essential activities to limit infectious disease spread.
- Notifiable disease – disease that, by law, must be reported to public health authorities upon diagnosis due to its potential to cause outbreaks and public health emergencies.
  - List of notifiable diseases
- Protective sequestration – public health practice of isolating a group of people or a community potentially exposed to a disease for monitoring and prevention of disease spread.
- Public health – science and practice of strategies to protect and improve the health of populations through education, policy making, and research for disease and injury prevention.
  - Community health services – health services designed to improve the health and well-being of community members by providing accessible healthcare, education, and preventive measures.
  - Health communication – study and application of disseminating health information dissemination and promoting health literacy to educate and empower individuals and communities about health.
  - Health education – Educational programs and initiatives aimed at raising awareness, disseminating knowledge, building skills and influencing attitudes and behaviors so that people can make informed decision about health and wellness.
- Outbreak response – coordinated strategies and interventions to detect, control, contain and mitigate the impact of a disease outbreak in a community or region.
- Quarantine – restriction of movement and activities of individuals with symptoms of potential exposure to a contagious infetious disease to prevent further spread during the incubation period.
- Respiratory source control – Implementation of measures like masking to capture respiratory droplets and aerosols in order to prevent or reduce airborne transmission of respiratory pathogens.
  - N95 respirator – protective mask designed to fit very closely to the face and provide protection against at least 95% of very small, airborne particles (dust, microbes, pollutants, etc.) less than 0.3 microns in diameter.
  - Surgical mask – loose-fitting device covering the nose and mouth that primarily protects the wearer from inhaling infectious respiratory droplets and aerosols in medical and public settings.
  - Personal protective equipment – Equipment such as masks, gloves, gowns, and face shields worn by healthcare workers or others at risk to shield them from exposure to infectious agents or hazardous materials.
- Safe sex – sexual practices that minimize the risk of contracting sexually transmitted infections, including the use of condoms and engaging in mutually monogamous relationships.
- Sanitation – Measures and practices to maintaining hygienic living conditions through proper waste management, clean water access, and sewage disposal to prevent disease spread.
- Screening – Brief medical evaluations and tests to detect the early signs of a disease, often administered to asymptomatic individuals.
- Social distancing – Public health measure to maintain physical distance between people to reduce the chance of respiratory transmission of infectious diseases in crowded settings.
- Standard infection control precautions – fundamental infection prevention and control practices to be adopted by staff in healthcare settings, irrespective of patient's infectious status.
- Sterilization – process of destroying infectious agents (as well as all other life forms) from a surface, fluid, or biological medium by using heat, chemicals, irradiation, high pressure, filtration, or a combination of these methods.
- Transmission-based precautions – Additional or tailored infection control measures based on the specific mode or epidemiology of disease transmission.
- Travel restrictions – Policies and regulations that limit or restrict the movement of people across regions or countries to control the spread of infectious diseases.
- Universal precautions – Approach in which all human blood and certain bodily fluids are treated potentially infectious, requiring healthcare workers to wear PPE all the time.
- Vector control – Strategies to reduce or eliminate populations of animals and insects that can transmit diseases to humans.
- Wastewater surveillance – Monitoring and analysis of wastewater to detect and track the presence of specific infectious agents to identify trends in disease prevalence or to provide early warning of disease outbreaks
- Zoning – Designating clean and dirty areas to prevent contaminated objects from being placed in a clean area and creat cross-contamination.

== Emerging infectious disease ==
Emerging infectious disease – diseases caused by newly identified or reemerging infectious agents that have recently rapidly increased in incidence or geographic range, posing a potentially significant threat to public health in the near future.

- Antigenic drift – Genetic variation in viruses of mutations in virus genes that code virus proteins
- Antigenic shift – Process by which two or more different strains of a virus combine to form a new subtype
- Antimicrobial resistance surveillance
  - EARS-Net – Biological database
- Biosecurity – Preventive measures designed to reduce the risk of infectious disease transmission
- CRISPR – Family of DNA sequences found in prokaryotic organisms
- Disease X – Placeholder infectious disease name from the World Health Organization
- Emergent virus – Classification of species of viruses
- Evolutionary epidemiology
- Genetic epidemiology – Study of the role of genetic factors in determining health and disease
- Global Health Initiatives – Fundraising initiatives for health in developing countries
- Microbial phylogenetics – Field of study
- One Health Model – Multiple health practices working together
- Genomic reassortment – Type of nonhereditary genetic change involving swapping of DNA or RNA
- Re-emerging disease
- Reverse zoonosis – Transmission of a pathogen from humans to non-human animals
- Selection pressure
- Synthetic biology – Interdisciplinary branch of biology and engineering
- Viral phylodynamics – Study of what affects viral life spans

== Miscellaneous concepts ==
- Disease ecology – sub-discipline of ecology concerned with the mechanisms, patterns, and effects of host-pathogen interactions, particularly those of infectious diseases.
- Eradication – Elimination of a disease from all hosts
- Economics of Infectious Diseases
- Infectious disease (medical specialty) – Medical specialty dealing with the diagnosis, control and treatment of infections
- Infectious disease informatics
- Microbial bioterrorism – Terrorism involving biological agents
- Pandemic prevention – Organization and management of preventive measures against pandemics
- Tropical disease – Disease prevalent in or unique to tropical and subtropical regions
  - Tropical medicine – Interdisciplinary branch of medicine

== History of infectious diseases ==
=== Individual diseases ===
- History of cholera
- History of HIV/AIDS
- History of leprosy
- History of malaria
- History of plague
- History of polio
- History of smallpox
- History of syphilis
- History of tuberculosis
- History of typhoid fever
- History of yellow fever

=== People ===
- Alexander Fleming – Scottish physician and microbiologist (1881–1955)
- Maurice Hilleman – American vaccinologist (1919–2005)
- Edward Jenner – English physician (1749–1823)
- Robert Koch – German physician and bacteriologist (1843–1910)
- Louis Pasteur – French chemist, pharmacist and microbiologist (1822–1895)
- Jonas Salk – American inventor of the polio vaccine (1914–1995)
- Ignaz Semmelweis – Early pioneer of antiseptic procedures
- John Snow – English epidemiologist and physician (1813–1858)
- Israel Jacob Kligler – Israeli microbiologist

=== Major epidemics and pandemics ===
- List of epidemics and pandemics
- Black Death – 1346–1353 plague pandemic in Eurasia and North Africa
- Spanish flu – 1918–1920 global influenza pandemic
- HIV/AIDS pandemic (1981–present)
- COVID-19 pandemic – Pandemic caused by SARS-CoV-2 (2019–2023)

=== Other ===
- Discovery of disease-causing pathogens
- Smallpox eradication
- Social history of viruses – Influence of viruses and viral infections on human history
