= 2022–2023 pediatric care crisis =

Viral disease outbreak

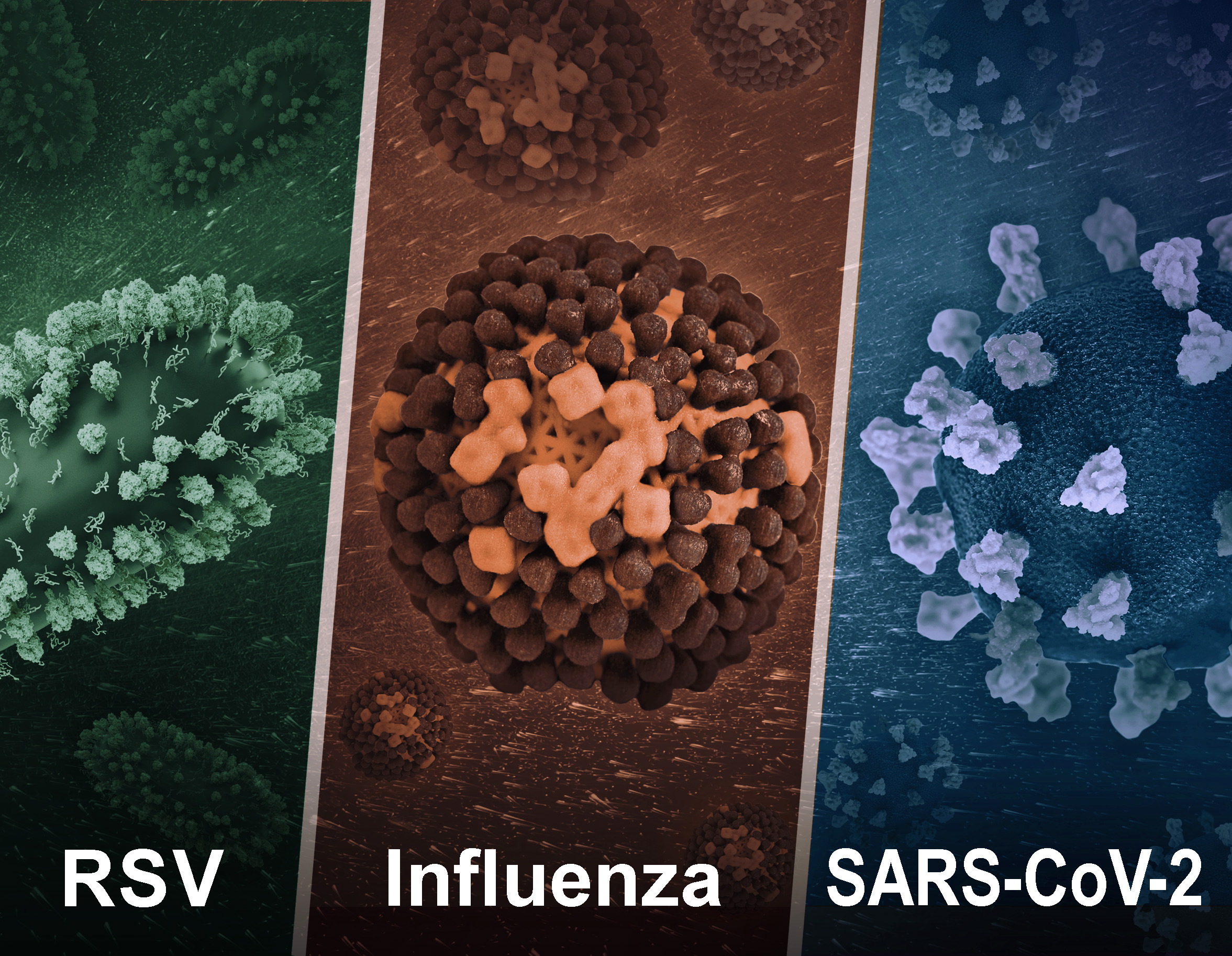
- RSV, Influenza, and COVID-19 are among the primary contributors to the crisis

In the waning months of 2022, the first northern hemisphere autumn with the nearly full relaxation of public health precautions related to the COVID-19 pandemic, hospitals in the United States and Canada began to see overwhelming numbers of pediatric care patients, primarily driven by a massive upswing in respiratory syncytial virus (RSV) cases, but also flu, rhinovirus, enterovirus, and SARS-CoV-2.

With high levels of hand-washing, mask-wearing, and social isolation during the early years of the pandemic, children born during this period had particularly low levels of exposure to RSV, with public health professionals reporting extremely low levels of RSV transmission in 2020 and 2021. In contrast, 2022 evidenced a dramatic reversal.

Starting in September 2022, many emergency departments and intensive-care units in the United States have been either at-capacity or over-capacity, with a variety of hospitals resorting to extreme measures which have included the use of a makeshift tent outside Johns Hopkins Children's Center in Maryland and the proposed deployment of the National Guard in Connecticut.

Outside of North America, in the United Kingdom, pediatric infections also began to spike beyond pre-pandemic levels, albeit with different illnesses, such as Group A streptococcal infection and resultant scarlet fever. As of mid-December in 2022, 19 children in the UK had died due to Strep A and the wave of infections had begun to spread into North America and Mainland Europe.

In late 2023, a similar pattern of pediatric illness appeared to emerge with Mycoplasma pneumoniae in China during the first full autumn and winter season following relaxation of its stringent Zero-COVID policies. Increased rates of pediatric Mycoplasma pneumonia were simultaneously observed in other parts of the world, with Denmark declaring that infections had reached epidemic levels.

== Timeline ==
The crisis had no clear start date, as multiple disease outbreaks occurred over the course of 2022, with cascading effects on healthcare systems already burdened by the ongoing pandemic. Notably, staffing shortages led commentators in the US to say that the system was "crumbling" in August. While authorities at one health region in Ontario spoke of "serious" and "unprecedented" challenges in September. In Canada, warning signs appeared as early as July with a spike in enterovirus ("hand foot and mouth disease") cases which continued into August.

The pediatric care crisis in the United States began to be visible in statistics with high late-summer, August 2022 hospitalization numbers of children infected with rhinovirus and enterovirus, which are both acute respiratory illnesses and often indistinguishable without molecular sequencing or via a specific rRT-PCR assay. By early September, the Centers of Disease Control issued an official Health Advisory about severe respiratory illnesses from Rhinoviruses and/or Enteroviruses D-68.

RSV then began to see its exponential rise to the top of pediatric infections in September and October 2022, with mid and late-autumn SARS-CoV-2 and seasonal flu infections increasing the pediatric care burden later into the year.By mid-autumn, flu cases had already shuttered schools and reactivated remote learning in parts of the American South and mid-Atlantic.

On October 26, the Government of Canada issued an advisory that Canada was experiencing a shortage of children's acetaminophen and ibuprofen due to the spike in infections. By late October, staff infections with respiratory illnesses had compounded the previous staffing shortages in Ontario causing many emergency rooms and other departments at multiple hospitals to close. In the USA staffing shortages and the spike in infections saw 80% of pediatric beds full nationally, with the worst numbers being in Rhode Island where beds were 99% full, causing some hospitals to set up field tents.

On November 7, researchers determined that the United States was concurrently facing epidemics of flu, RSV, and COVID-19 in children. As of early November, 75% of beds in US children's hospitals were full and the crisis had spread to eastern Canada, with a children's hospital in Ottawa reporting over 130% capacity for both intensive care and inpatient beds. On November 1, 2022, California's Orange County declared a pediatric health emergency after seeing record-breaking numbers of children enter emergency rooms in the county's hospitals. At the same time over fourteen thousand students were out of school due to illness in the Edmonton region of Alberta. By November 5, Emily Gruenwold, president and CEO of Children's Healthcare Canada said that "across the country, almost without exception, our children's hospitals are all running at 100 percent occupancy or more" in part because the shortage of over-the-counter painkillers that could suppress fevers lead more parents to bring their sick children to hospitals.

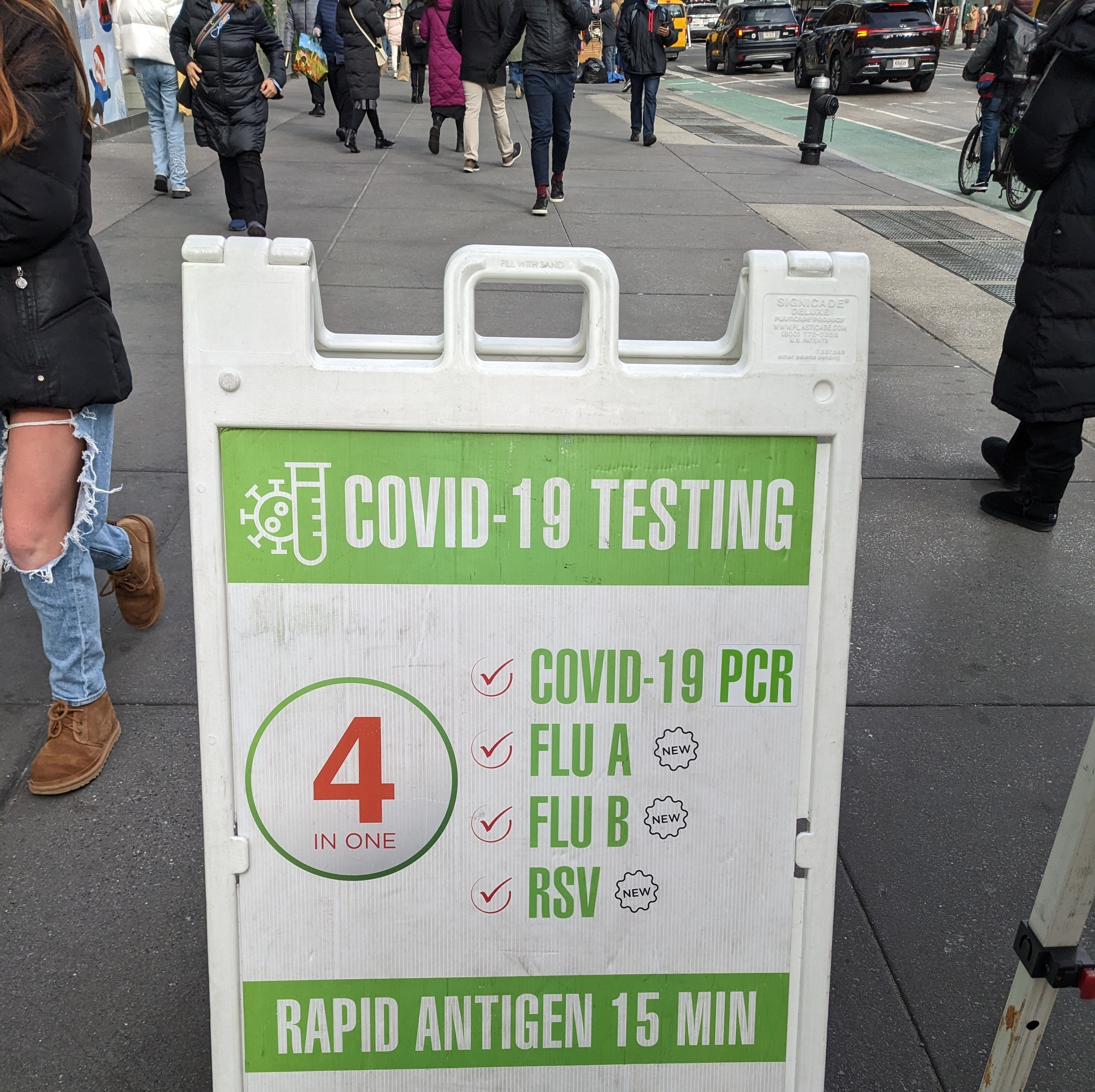
Testing booth for COVID-19, both major influenza strains, and RSV in New York City.

On November 14, the Children's Hospital Association and the American Academy of Pediatrics wrote a joint letter to President Biden and Health Secretary Xavier Becerra, asking that the administration declare an emergency that would unlock funding and regulatory flexibilities akin to the ongoing COVID-19 emergency. This request came as RSV hospitalizations reached seven times pre-pandemic levels among infants 6 months and younger and flu hospitalizations were the highest in a decade. One US state, Oregon, had already declared a public health emergency related to the pediatric care crisis several days prior to the national appeal. The US Department of Health and Human Services decided against a national emergency declaration at the time, deciding to instead support struggling communities on a case-by-case basis.

Also on November 14, the Public Health Agency of Canada's FluWatch surveillance program took action on one major component of the pediatric crisis, declaring the flu an epidemic and noting a spike in pediatric flu hospitalizations above expected levels. Days later, on November 17, the Canadian Medical Protective Association (a legal defense fund for doctors) issued advice to its members about practising out of scope due to the "unprecedented overcrowding occurring in pediatric hospitals across the country". On November 23, a group called "Moms, Grandmoms, and Caregivers for Kids" issued an open letter to the Canadian federal and provincial governments about the crisis because, they said, "There is a palpable sense of hopelessness amongst parents and those that serve kids on the frontlines. Doctors say the crisis will get worse before it gets better, yet we see no tangible signs of action." The signatories to the letter included Lisa Raitt, Penny Collenette, Kathleen Wynne, and Marg McCuaig-Boyd. By the end of November, Canadian pediatric hospitalizations for seasonal influenza alone were 20 times the usual rate of admissions for that time of year. On December 9, the premiers of Canada's provinces and territories held a joint news conference to address the crisis in children's hospitals.

By mid-December, some US children's hospitals were receiving transfer requests from communities far outside of their typical geographic coverage areas. Helen DeVos Children's Hospital of Grand Rapids, Michigan fielded requests from communities in the state's Upper Peninsula, upwards of 300 miles away, and the state of Illinois. Both areas share land borders with Wisconsin rather than lower Michigan, but Wisconsin's hospitals were full. Devos also had to turn away patients and could only accept children who were severely ill.

The UK's spike in severe pediatric Strep A infections also began to spill over into the United States in December 2022, with Colorado, Texas, and Arizona reporting atypically high numbers of cases in children's hospitals, including two deaths in Colorado, while the World Health Organization noted that the Netherlands, Ireland, Sweden, and France had also begun experiencing unusually high levels of Strep A infections. On 22 December, the US CDC issued a health advisory due to increasing levels of Strep A infections in the United States.

A study released on 7 February 2023 found that 40 percent of US households had experienced infection by one of the three primary drivers of the pediatric crisis in North America during the 2022–2023 winter season.

== Coinfections ==
While coinfections have always been a possibility in pediatric medicine, SARS-CoV-2 has made coinfection with multiple viruses much more common, with doctors reporting back-to-back hospitalizations and children presenting with upwards of four distinct respiratory viruses in the span of a single month. According to a CDC report released in December 2022, children who experience a coinfection of SARS-CoV-2 and influenza are more likely to encounter adverse outcomes and require invasive or noninvasive respiratory support than children infected with influenza only.

== Contributing factors ==
In the two decades preceding the crisis, US hospitals experienced a significant decline in the number of pediatric beds due to lower billable procedures in pediatric admissions in comparison to adults. Pediatric beds have also been occupied by greater numbers of young people experiencing mental health emergencies during the COVID-19 pandemic, who have been admitted to ICUs following suicide attempts.

In typical years, without a surge of cases and multiple coinfections, RSV is the most common cause of pediatric hospitalization in developed countries, and Bronchiolitis caused by RSV is more severe and leads to higher hospitalization rates as compared with non-RSV bronchiolitis.

A widespread shortage of liquid amoxicillin has also complicated pediatric care for primary bacterial infections, such as Strep A, as well as potentially dangerous secondary bacterial infections arising from a primary viral infection.

== Government responses ==
In the US, Surgeon General Vivek Murthy noted that the federal government was responding to the crisis in a variety of ways. First, it was offering direct support to struggling hospitals by providing personnel, ventilators, and equipment. The federal government also actively assisted in interstate coordination of available beds across given regions. Although the US would not declare a public health emergency specific to the pediatric crisis, HHS Secretary Xavier Becerra wrote, in a 2 December letter to US governors, that the existing emergency declaration for COVID-19 could be broadly applied to the surge in other respiratory viruses related to the relaxation of pandemic public health measures.

== Broader crisis ==
In December 2022, the terms "tripledemic" and "tridemic" were used to describe simultaneous outbreaks of RSV, influenza, and COVID-19 in both Canada and the United States. Accordingly, with cases of RSV at 300% more than would be expected in a normal season and rising numbers of adult infections together with increased COVID-19 hospitalizations, some public health professionals have expressed alarm at the potential for spillover into a widespread medical crisis, not confined solely to pediatric care.

== See also ==
- Twindemic
- Outline of infectious disease concepts
