= Plant disease epidemiology =

Study of diseases in plant populations

Plant disease epidemiology is the study of disease in plant populations. Much like diseases of humans and other animals, plant diseases occur due to pathogens such as bacteria, viruses, fungi, oomycetes, nematodes, phytoplasmas, protozoa, and parasitic plants. Plant disease epidemiologists strive for an understanding of the cause and effects of disease and develop strategies to intervene in situations where crop losses may occur. Destructive and non-destructive methods are used to detect diseases in plants. Additionally, understanding the responses of the immune system in plants will further benefit and limit the loss of crops. Typically successful intervention will lead to a low enough level of disease to be acceptable, depending upon the value of the crop.

Plant disease epidemiology is often looked at from a multi-disciplinary approach, requiring biological, statistical, agronomic and ecological perspectives. Biology is necessary for understanding the pathogen and its life cycle. It is also necessary for understanding the physiology of the crop and how the pathogen is adversely affecting it. Agronomic practices often influence disease incidence for better or for worse. Ecological influences are numerous. Native species of plants may serve as reservoirs for pathogens that cause disease in crops. Statistical models are often applied in order to summarize and describe the complexity of plant disease epidemiology, so that disease processes can be more readily understood. For example, comparisons between patterns of disease progress for different diseases, cultivars, management strategies, or environmental settings can help in determining how plant diseases may best be managed. Policy can be influential in the occurrence of diseases, through actions such as restrictions on imports from sources where a disease occurs.

In 1963 J. E. van der Plank published "Plant Diseases: Epidemics and Control", providing a theoretical framework for the study of the epidemiology of plant diseases. This book provides a theoretical framework based on experiments in many different host pathogen systems and moved the study of plant disease epidemiology forward rapidly, especially for fungal foliar pathogens. Using this framework we can now model and determine thresholds for epidemics that take place in a homogeneous environment such as a mono-cultural crop field.

== Elements of an epidemic ==
Disease epidemics in plants can cause huge losses in yield of crops as well threatening to wipe out an entire species such as was the case with Dutch Elm Disease and could occur with Sudden Oak Death. An epidemic of potato late blight, caused by Phytophthora infestans, led to the Great Irish Famine and the loss of many lives.

Commonly the elements of an epidemic are referred to as the “disease triangle”: a susceptible host, pathogen, and conducive environment. For a disease to occur all three of these must be present. Below is an illustration of this point. Where all three items meet, there is a disease. The fourth element missing from this illustration for an epidemic to occur is time. As long as all three of these elements are present disease can initiate, an epidemic will only ensue if all three continue to be present. Anyone of the three might be removed from the equation though. The host might out-grow susceptibility as with high-temperature adult-plant resistance, the environment changes and is not conducive for the pathogen to cause disease, or the pathogen is controlled through a fungicide application.

Sometimes a fourth factor of time is added as the time at which a particular infection occurs, and the length of time conditions remain viable for that infection, can also play an important role in epidemics. The age of the plant species can also play a role, as certain species change in their levels of disease resistance as they mature; in a process known as ontogenic resistance.

If all of the criteria are not met, such as a susceptible host and pathogen are present, but the environment is not conducive to the pathogen infecting and causing disease, a disease cannot occur. For example, corn is planted into a field with corn residue that has the fungus Cercospora zea-maydis, the causal agent of Grey leaf spot of corn, but if the weather is too dry, and there is no leaf wetness the spores of the fungus in the residue cannot germinate and initiate infection.

Likewise, if the host is susceptible and the environment favours the development of disease but the pathogen is not present there is no disease. Taking the example above, the corn is planted into a ploughed field where there is no corn residue with the fungus Cercospora zea-maydis, the causal agent of Grey leaf spot of corn, present but the weather means extended periods of leaf wetness, there is no infection initiated.

When a pathogen requires a vector to be spread then for an epidemic to occur the vector must be plentiful and active.

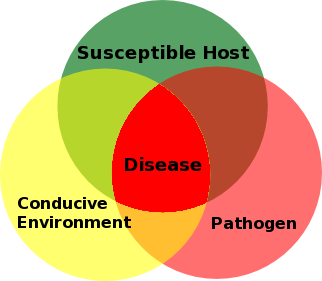
Plant disease triangle illustration

=== Types of epidemics ===
Pathogens cause monocyclic epidemics with a low birth rate and death rate, meaning they only have one infection cycle per season. They are typical of soil-borne diseases such as Fusarium wilt of flax. Polycyclic epidemics are caused by pathogens capable of several infection cycles a season. They are most often caused by airborne diseases such as powdery mildew. Bimodal polycyclic epidemics can also occur. For example, in brown rot of stone fruits the blossoms and the fruits are infected at different times.

For some diseases the disease occurrence needs to be evaluated over several growing seasons, especially if growing the crops in monoculture year after year or growing perennial plants. Such conditions can mean that the inoculum produced in one season can be carried over to the next leading to a build-up over the years, especially in the tropics where there are no clear-cut breaks between growing seasons.

Epidemics under these conditions are called polyetic; they can be caused by both monocyclic and polycyclic pathogens. Apple powdery mildew is an example of a polyetic epidemic caused by a polycyclic pathogen; Dutch Elm disease a polyetic epidemic caused by a monocyclic pathogen.

== Detecting diseases ==
There are many different ways to spot a disease both destructively and non-destructively. In order to understand the cause, affects, and cure for a disease, the non-destructive method is more favorable. They are techniques where sample preparation and/or repetitive processes are not necessary for measuring and observing the conditions of the plants’ health. Non-destructive approaches may include image processing, imaging-based, spectroscopy based, and remote sensing.

Photography, digital imaging, and image analysis technology are useful tools to set up for image processing. Valuable data are extracted from these images and then are analyzed for diseases. But before any analysis happens, image acquisition is the first step. And within this step contains three stages. First, is energy which is the light source of illuminating from the object of interest. Second, is the optical system such as a camera to focus on the energy. Third, is the energy measured by the sensor. To continue with the image processing, there is a pre-process where one can make certain that there are no factors such as background, size, shape of leave, light, and camera effects the analysis.After the pre-process, image segmentation is used to split the image between regions of disease and non-disease. In these images, there features of color, texture, and shape that can be extracted and used for the analysis.

Imaging-based approaches for the detection has two main methods, fluorescence imaging and hyper-spectral imaging. Fluorescence imaging helps identify the metabolic conditions of the plant. In order to do so, a tool is used to present light onto the chlorophyll complex of the plant. Hyper-spectral imaging is used to obtain reflected images. Such methods consist of the spectral information divergence (SID) where it can assess the spectral reflectance by looking at wavelength bands.

Another non-destructive approach is spectroscopy. This is where the electromagnetic spectrum and matter becomes involved. There are visible and infrared spectroscopy, fluorescence spectroscopy, and electric impedance spectroscopy. Each spectroscopy gives information including the types of radiation energy, the types of material, the nature of interaction, and more.

Finally, the last non-destructive approach is the application of remote sensing in plant diseases. This is where data is obtained without having to be with the plant while observing. There is hyper-spectral and multispectral in remote sensing. Hyper-spectral helps provide high spectral and spatial resolution. Multispectral remote sensing provides the severity of the disease.

As of 2015 there is a need for further development of antibody- and molecular marker-tests for new pathogens and occurrence of known pathogens in new hosts, and also a need for further global integration of quarantine and surveillance.

== Immune System ==
Plants can show many signs or physical evidence of fungal, viral or bacterial infections. This can range from rusts or molds to not showing anything at all when a pathogen invades the plant (occurs in some viral diseases in plants). Symptoms which are visible effects of diseases on the plant consist of changes in color, shape or function. These changes in the plant coordinates with their response to pathogens or foreign organisms that is negatively effecting their system. Even though plants do not have cells that can move and fight foreign organisms and they do not have a somatic adaptive immune system, they do have and depend on innate immunity of each cell and on systemic signals.

In responses to infections, plants have a two-branched innate immune system. The first branch has to recognize and respond to molecules that are similar to classes of microbes, this includes non-pathogens. On the other hand, the second branch responds to pathogen virulence factors, either directly or indirectly to the host.

Pattern recognition receptors (PRRs) are activated by recognition of pathogen or microbial-associated molecular patterns known as PAMPs or MAMPs. These leads to PAMP-Triggered Immunity or Pattern-Triggered Immunity (PTI) where PRRs causes intracellular signaling, transcriptional reprogramming, and biosynthesis of a complex output response that decreases colonization.

In addition, R genes also known as Effector-Triggered Immunity is activated by specific pathogen “effectors” that can trigger a strong antimicrobial response. Both PTI and ETI assist in plant defense through activation of DAMP which is Damage-associated Compounds. Cellular changes or changes in gene expression are activated through ion channel gating, oxidative burst, cellular redox changes, or protein kinase cascades through PTI and ETI receptors.

== Impact ==
Through 2013, invasive tree diseases had killed about 100 million elm trees combined in the United Kingdom and United States and 3.5 billion American chestnut trees.

== See also ==
- Distance Diagnostics Through Digital Imaging (DDDI)
- Landscape epidemiology
- Plant disease forecasting
- Robert Hartig
- Forest pathology
- Phytopathology with historical landmarks in plant pathology
