= Endemic (epidemiology) =

Disease which is constantly present in an area

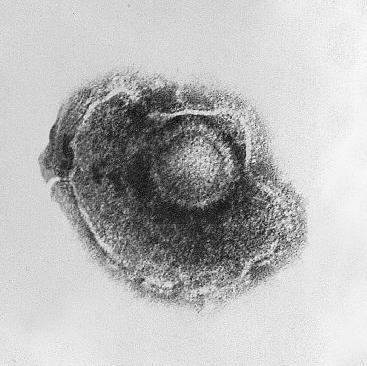
Human alphaherpesvirus 3 virion − a herpesvirus known to infect humans. It causes chickenpox (varicella), a disease most commonly affecting children, teens, and young adults, and shingles (herpes zoster) in adults.

In epidemiology, an infection is said to be endemic in a specific population or populated place when that infection is constantly present, or maintained at a baseline level. The term describes the distribution of an infectious disease among a group of people or animals or within a populated area. An endemic disease always has a steady, predictable number of people or animals getting sick, but that number can be high (hyperendemic) or low (hypoendemic), and the disease can be severe or mild. Also, a disease that is usually endemic can become epidemic.

For example, chickenpox is endemic in the United Kingdom, but malaria is not. Every year, there are a few cases of malaria reported in the UK, but these do not lead to sustained transmission in the population due to the lack of a suitable vector (mosquitoes of the genus Anopheles). Consequently, there is no constant baseline level of malaria infection in the UK, and the disease is not endemic. However, the number of people who get chickenpox in the UK varies little from year to year, so chickenpox is considered endemic in the UK.

== Mathematical determination ==
For an infection that relies on person-to-person transmission, to be endemic, each person who becomes infected with the disease must pass it on to one other person on average. Assuming a completely susceptible population, that means that the basic reproduction number (R_{0}) of the infection must equal one. In a population with some immune individuals, the basic reproduction number multiplied by the proportion of susceptible individuals in the population (S) must be one. This takes account of the probability of each individual to whom the disease may be transmitted being susceptible to it, effectively discounting the immune sector of the population. So, for a disease to be in an endemic steady state or endemic equilibrium, it holds that

$$R_0 \times S = 1$$

In this way, the infection neither dies out, nor does the number of infected people increase exponentially. An infection that starts as an epidemic will eventually either die out (with the possibility of it resurging in a theoretically predictable cyclical manner) or reach the endemic steady state, depending on a number of factors, including the virulence of the disease and its mode of transmission.

If a disease is in an endemic steady state in a population, the relation above allows the basic reproduction number (R_{0}) of a particular infection to be estimated. This in turn can be fed into a mathematical model for the epidemic. Based on the reproduction number, we can define the epidemic waves, such as the first wave, second wave, etc. for COVID-19 in different regions and countries.

== Misuse ==
It has been claimed that endemic COVID-19 implies that the disease severity would be mild. However, endemicity has no inherent relationship with disease severity. Endemic COVID-19 could be mild if previously acquired immunity reduces the risk of death and disability during future infections, but in itself endemicity only means that there will be a steady, predictable number of sick people.

== Related terms ==
=== Categories of endemic diseases ===
Holoendemic
An endemic disease with an extremely high rate of infection, especially a disease that infects nearly everyone early in life, so that nearly all adults have developed some level of immunity.
Hyperendemic
An endemic disease with a high rate of infection, especially one affecting people of all ages equally.
Mesoendemic
An endemic disease with a moderate rate of infection. This term is often used to describe the prevalence of malaria in a local area, with 10 to 50% of children showing evidence of prior infection being considered a moderate level for that disease.
Hypoendemic
An endemic disease with a low rate of infection. Typhoid fever is a hypoendemic disease in the US.

=== Categories for non-endemic diseases ===
Sporadic
A disease that appears occasionally, but, unlike endemic disease, is not always present at a steady and predictable level.
Outbreak
An epidemic, especially one affecting a very small area, such as the people in one town or attending a single event. The 2019–2020 measles outbreaks showed a normally endemic disease causing an epidemic outbreak, primarily among unvaccinated people.
Epidemic
A new disease that is spreading or a previously endemic disease whose infection rate is increasing significantly. Seasonal flu frequently appears as an epidemic.
Pandemic
An epidemic affecting a very large part of the world, generally multiple countries or multiple continents. Seasonal flu is sometimes a global pandemic.

== Examples ==
Infections that are usually considered endemic include:

- Common cold
- COVID-19
- Lassa fever
- Malaria
- Polio
- Rotavirus
- Hepatitis C
- Measles

Smallpox was an endemic disease until it was eradicated through vaccination.

== Etymology ==
The word endemic is from Neo-Latin endēmicus, from Greek ἔνδημος, éndēmos, "native". Éndēmos is formed of ἐν, en, meaning "in, within", and δῆμος, demos, "the people". The word entered the English language as a loan word from the French endémique, and originally seems to have been used in the sense of diseases that occur at a constant amount in a country, as opposed to epidemic diseases, which are exploding in cases.

== See also ==
- Syndemic – when two or more public health problems coincide and exacerbate each other
- Eradication of infectious diseases – when an infection declines until it no longer exists
- Vaccine-preventable diseases
