= Latent period (epidemiology) =

Time interval between infection by a pathogen and the individual becoming infectious

In some diseases, as depicted in this diagram, the latent period is shorter than the incubation period. In such cases, a person can transmit infection without showing any signs of the disease and is called subclinically infectious or an asymptomatic carrier

In epidemiology, particularly in the discussion of infectious disease dynamics (modeling), the latent period (also known as the latency period or the pre-infectious period) is the time interval between when an individual or host is infected by a pathogen and when that individual becomes infectious, i.e. capable of transmitting pathogens to other susceptible individuals.

== Relationship with related concepts in infectious disease dynamics ==
To understand the spreading dynamics of an infectious disease or an epidemic, three important time periods should be carefully distinguished: incubation period, pre-infectious or latent period and infectious period. Two other relevant and important time period concepts are generation time and serial interval.

A potentially disease-causing infection process begins when an infectious agent, or a pathogen, is successfully transmitted from one host to another. Pathogens leave the body of one host through a portal of exit, are carried by some mode of transmission and after coming into contact (exposure) with a new susceptible host, they enter the host's body through an appropriate portal of entry. Upon entering the new host, they take a period of time to overcome or evade the immune response of the body and to multiply or replicate after having traveled to their favored sites within the host’s body (tissue invasion and tropism). When the pathogens become sufficiently numerous and toxic to cause damage to the body, the host begins to display symptoms of a clinical disease (i.e. the host becomes symptomatic).

=== Incubation period ===
The time interval from the time of invasion by an infectious pathogen to the time of onset (first appearance) of symptoms of the disease in question is called the incubation period. After the incubation period is over, the host enters the symptomatic period. Moreover, at a certain point in time after infection, the host becomes capable of transmitting pathogens to others, i.e. they become infectious or communicable. Depending on the disease, the host individual may or may not be infectious during the incubation period. The incubation period is important in the dynamics of disease transmission because it determines the timing of symptom-based case detection relative to the time of infection. This helps in the evaluation of the outcomes of control measures based on symptomatic surveillance. Knowledge of the incubation period can also help estimate the number of infections from observed cases.

The period from the time of infection to the time of becoming infectious is called the pre-infectious period or the latent period. During the pre-infectious or latent period, a host may or may not show symptoms (i.e. the incubation period may or may not be over), but in both cases, the host is not capable of infecting other hosts, i.e. transmitting pathogens to other hosts. The latent period, rather than the incubation period, is more directly relevant to the transmission dynamics of an infectious disease or epidemic.

=== Infectious period ===
The time interval during which the host is infectious, i.e. the pathogens can be transmitted directly or indirectly from the infected host to another individual, is called the infectious period (or the period of communicability), defined as the period from the end of the pre-infectious period or the latent period until the time when the host can no longer transmit the infection to other individuals. During the infectious period, a host may or may not show symptoms, but they are capable of infecting other individuals. The duration of the infectious period depends on factors including the host's immune response, characteristics of the pathogen, the site of infection, the severity of disease, and treatment; it ends when the pathogen or its infectious forms are no longer present in sufficient quantity to permit transmission.

=== Latent period ===
In some cases, the pre-infectious or latent period and the incubation period end at approximately the same time. In this case, the infected individual becomes infectious at around the same time they start showing symptoms. In certain other infectious diseases such as smallpox or SARS, the host becomes infectious after the onset of symptoms. In this case, the latent period is longer than the incubation period. In these two cases, the disease can be effectively controlled using symptomatic surveillance. A related term is the duration of shedding or the shedding period, which is defined as the time duration during which a host or patient excretes pathogens through saliva, urine, feces or other bodily fluids.

However, for some infectious diseases, the symptoms of the clinical disease may appear after the host becomes infectious. In this case, the pre-infectious or latent period has a shorter duration than the incubation period, the infectious period begins before the end of the incubation period and the host can infect others for some time was hout showing any noticeable symptoms. This period of infectiousness before the onset of noticeable symptoms is referred to as the presymptomatic period, and transmission occurring during it is called presymptomatic transmission. When an infected host remains without clinically apparent symptoms, the infection may be described as a subclinical infection. An individual who harbors and can transmit the pathogen without developing clinical symptoms may be described as an asymptomatic carrier. This differs from presymptomatic infection, in which the host is not yet symptomatic but will subsequently develop symptoms.

For example, in COVID-19, the infectious period begins approximately 2 days before the onset of symptoms and 44% of the secondary infections may happen during this pre-symptomatic stage. In these kinds of cases with a significant number of pre-symptomatic (asymptomatic) transmissions, symptomatic surveillance-based disease control measures (such as isolation, contact tracing, enhanced hygiene, etc.) are likely to have their effectiveness reduced, because a significant portion of the transmission may take place before the onset of symptoms and this has to be taken into account when designing control measures.

The infectious period is a very important element in the infectious disease spreading dynamics. If the infectious period is long, then all else being equal, the measure of secondary infections (represented by the basic reproduction number, R_{0}) will generally be larger. For example, HIV can remain transmissible for many years in the absence of effective treatment, so its prolonged infectious period can contribute substantially to transmission despite relatively low transmission probability per sexual act. From the viewpoint of controlling an epidemic, the goal is to reduce the effective infectious period either by treatment or by isolating the patient from the community. Sometimes a treatment can paradoxically increase the effective infectious period by preventing death through supportive care and thereby increasing the probability of infection of other individuals.

=== Generation time ===
The generation time (or generation interval) of an infectious disease is the time interval between infection in an individual (infector) and infection in another individual (infectee) after successful transmission of pathogens. The generation time specifies how fast infections are spreading in the community with the passing of each generation. In contrast, the effective reproductive number determines how many new infections are generated by each infectious individual under prevailing conditions. The latent period and the infectious period helps determine the generation time of an infection. The mean generation time is equal to the sum of the mean latent period and one-half of the mean infectious period, assuming that infectiousness is evenly distributed across the infectious period.

Since the precise moment of infection is usually difficult to determine, the generation time cannot generally be observed directly for two successive hosts. Generally, in infectious disease statistics, the onset of clinical symptoms for all the hosts are reported. For two successive generations (or cases or hosts) in a chain of infection, the serial interval is defined as the period of time between the onset of clinical symptoms in the first host (infector) and the onset of analogous clinical symptoms in the second host (infectee). Just like the generation time, the length of the serial interval depends on the durations of the latent period, the infectious period and the incubation period. Therefore the serial interval is often used as an observable proxy to estimate the generation time.

== Usage of the term outside epidemiology ==
Outside the confines of epidemiology, the term "latent period" may be defined in some general-purpose dictionaries (e.g. the Collins English Dictionary or Merriam-Webster Online Dictionary) as being the time interval between infection by a pathogen and the onset of symptoms, i.e., as a synonym for the epidemiologically distinct concept of "incubation period".

In the discussion of cancers (a non-infectious disease), the term "latency period" is used to indicate the time that passes between being exposed to something that can cause disease (such as radiation or a virus) and having symptoms. Doctors and medical journals may speak of "latent" tumors, which are present but not active or causing symptoms.

In the discussion of syphilis (a sexually transmitted infectious disease), the term "latent" refers to asymptomatic periods with different degrees of infectiousness.

These uses of latent or latency should be distinguished from the epidemiological definition of the latent period as the interval between infection and onset of infectiousness.

== See also ==
- Incubation period
- Infectious period
- Viral shedding
- Generation time
- Serial interval
- Basic reproduction number
- Asymptomatic carrier
