= Epidemic curve =

Statistical method to visualise the onset of an outbreak

An epidemic curve, also known as an epi curve or epidemiological curve, is a statistical chart used in epidemiology to visualise the onset of a disease outbreak. It can help with the identification of the mode of transmission of the disease. It can also show the disease's magnitude, whether cases are clustered or if there are individual case outliers, its trend over time, and its incubation period. It can give outbreak investigators an idea as to whether an outbreak is likely to be from a point source (such as from a food handler), a continuous common source (with ongoing contamination), or a propagated source (that is transmitted primarily between people).

Epidemic curves generally show the frequency of new cases compared to the date of disease onset.

== Examples ==
=== Hepatitis A ===
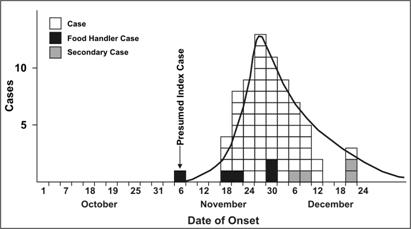
Common source outbreak of Hepatitis A in Nov-Dec 1978

This epidemic curve shows a presumed first case, known as the index case on November 6, 1978. Four days later, there was a steep increase in cases, followed by the curve tapering down to zero. Some cases were food handlers, and some secondary cases. It showed that this is probably a common source outbreak. Sometimes, cases could have been exposed days or weeks prior, and diseases with longer incubation periods would flatten these epidemic curves and lower the peaks.

=== COVID-19 pandemic ===
The first description of epidemiological curves from the COVID-19 pandemic showed the pattern of a "mixed outbreak". According to the investigators, there was likely a continuous common source outbreak at Wuhan Seafood Market in December 2019, potentially from several zoonotic events. As of the date of publication of the study, it is unknown which animal may have been the original reservoir of the virus, or how it was originally transmitted to humans. Following this, the investigators found that the outbreak likely became a propagated source, meaning that the virus became able to be transmitted from person to person. The New York Times has published a curve simulator for both the US and the world, on which the visitor can tinker the base parameters to get various outcomes.

== See also ==
- Infection control
- Social distancing
- Flatten the curve and raise the line
- Farr's laws
