= Plant disease forecasting =

Disease management system

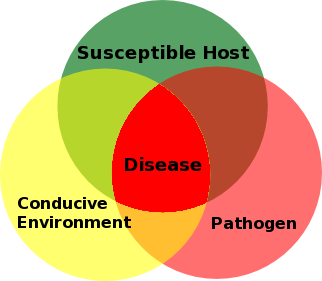
The plant disease triangle represents the factors necessary for disease to occur

Plant disease forecasting is a management system used to predict the occurrence or change in severity of plant diseases. At the field scale, these systems are used by growers to make economic decisions about disease treatments for control. Often the systems ask the grower a series of questions about the susceptibility of the host crop, and incorporate current and forecast weather conditions to make a recommendation. Typically a recommendation is made about whether disease treatment is necessary or not. Usually treatment is a pesticide application.

Forecasting systems are based on assumptions about the pathogen's interactions with the host and environment, the disease triangle. The objective is to accurately predict when the three factors – host, environment, and pathogen – all interact in such a fashion that disease can occur and cause economic losses.

In most cases the host can be suitably defined as resistant or susceptible, and the presence of the pathogen may often be reasonably ascertained based on previous cropping history or perhaps survey data. The environment is usually the factor that controls whether disease develops or not. Environmental conditions may determine the presence of the pathogen in a particular season through their effects on processes such as overwintering. Environmental conditions also affect the ability of the pathogen to cause disease, e.g. a minimum leaf wetness duration is required for grey leaf spot of corn to occur. In these cases a disease forecasting system attempts to define when the environment will be conducive to disease development.

Good disease forecasting systems must be reliable, simple, cost-effective and applicable to many diseases. As such they are normally only designed for diseases that are irregular enough to warrant a prediction system, rather than diseases that occur every year for which regular treatment should be employed. Forecasting systems can only be designed if there is also an understanding on the actual disease triangle parameters.

== Features ==
Models may predict dispersal – see Parry et al 2014 and Soubeyrand et al 2008 for especially successful estimations of patterns and speeds of spread; optimal strategy by goal, either epidemiological level or economic impact level – see Cunniffe et al 2015 for challenges in creating these models, and Papaïx et al 2014 specifically for implementation of these in ddal; and time to eradication – see Glasa et al 2004 for an example in aphid transmission of Plum pox virus.

Model quality has benefited both from improvements in the technology being supplied from the computer industry, and from improvements in statistical techniques.

== Examples of disease forecasting systems ==
Forecasting systems may use one of several parameters in order to work out disease risk, or a combination of factors. One of the first forecasting systems designed was for Stewart's wilt and based on winter temperature index as low temperatures would kill the vector of the disease so there would be no outbreak. An example of a multiple disease/pest forecasting system is the EPIdemiology, PREdiction, and PREvention (EPIPRE) system developed in the Netherlands for winter wheat that focused on multiple pathogens. USPEST.org graphs risks of various plants diseases based on weather forecasts with hourly resolution of leaf wetness. Forecasting models are often based on a relationship like simple linear regression where x is used to predict y. Other relationships can be modelled using population growth curves. The growth curve that is used will depend on the nature of the epidemic. Polycyclic epidemics such as potato late blight are usually best modelled by using the logistic model, whereas monocyclic epidemics may be best modelled using the monomolecular model. Correct choice of a model is essential for a disease forecasting system to be useful.

Plant disease forecasting models must be thoroughly tested and validated after being developed. Interest has arisen lately in model validation through the quantification of the economic costs of false positives and false negatives, where disease prevention measures may be used when unnecessary or not applied when needed respectively. The costs of these two types of errors need to be weighed carefully before deciding to use a disease forecasting system.

== Future developments ==
In the future, disease forecasting systems may become more useful as computing power increases and the amount of data that is available to plant pathologists to construct models increases. Good forecasting systems also may become increasingly important with climate change. It will be important to be able to accurately predict where disease outbreaks may occur, since they may not be in the historically known areas.
