= Diagnostic microscopy =

Diagnostic microscopy may refer to:

- Histopathology of tissues
- Smear test of free cells or small tissue fragments
