= Distance Diagnostics Through Digital Imaging =

Distance Diagnostics through Digital Imaging (DDDI) is the name of a system developed at the University of Georgia College of Agricultural and Environmental Sciences. It allows textual information and descriptive images to be submitted directly from Georgia county Extension offices for rapid diagnosis of plant and pest disease issues by resource professionals at the University. Since its inception in the late 1990s, universities throughout the United States have adapted this system for their use.

DDDI was developed by an IT team in collaboration with agricultural specialists at the University of Georgia in 1997. DDDI was initially created to allow Cooperative Extension offices throughout Georgia to easily submit relevant information and images of plant diseases; the goal is to receive a rapid diagnosis from University faculty, facilitating timely, corrective action. This new method for submitting samples of unidentified pests and organisms was exceptionally efficient, resulting in significant time and cost savings. “It's a reality that we can't have every specialist in every corner of the state to help farmers. But [DDDI] puts together expertise and technology, and this allows us to increase our service," said Stephen Portch, former University of Georgia Chancellor.

Customized DDDI systems are currently in place in ten US states, the Dominican Republic, the American Protectorates of the Pacific, and all of Central America. The system has grown to include commercial clients as well. DDDI has expanded from plant pathology into entomology, marine sciences, crop and soil sciences, forestry, and veterinary medicine.

The system utilizes conventional software and hardware, and has taken advantage of the Internet and the World Wide Web to attempt to improve the convenience of accessing such material as needed by various individuals.
