= Holoendemic =

A disease is holoendemic when essentially every individual in a population is infected.

Although the infection is ubiquitous, symptoms of disease do not appear equally across age groups. The young are more likely to express pathogenic responses, whilst the older hosts will carry the disease asymptomatically, or with reduced damage, due to adaptive immunity. Therefore, holoendemic diseases differ from hyperendemic diseases, of which symptoms are expressed equally by members across all age groups of a population.

Holoendemicity is frequently seen with malaria, specifically the strain caused by Plasmodium falciparum, in several regions of sub-Saharan Africa (one study found that 98.6% of the population had traces of the pathogen within a 4 month period). While individuals of all ages risk exposure to malaria, those under the age of five are particularly susceptible to the disease. Children account for the majority of both local and global malaria cases because they lack the adaptive immunity that comes with repeated exposure. Other examples of holoendemic diseases include ocular trachoma in certain areas in sub-Saharan Africa, where virtually all children in those populations have been infected, and hepatitis B in areas of the Marquesas Islands.
