= Incubation period =

Time between infection and the onset of disease symptoms

In some diseases, as depicted in this diagram, the latency period is shorter than the incubation period. After the latency period (but before clinical infection) the infected person can transmit the disease without signs of any symptoms. Such infection is called subclinical infection.

Incubation period (also known as the latent period or latency period) is the time elapsed between exposure to a pathogenic organism, a chemical, or radiation, and when symptoms and signs are first apparent. In a typical infectious disease, the incubation period signifies the period taken by the multiplying organism to reach a threshold necessary to produce symptoms in the host.

While latent or latency period may be synonymous, a distinction is sometimes made whereby the latent period is defined as the time from infection to infectiousness. Which period is shorter depends on the disease. A person may carry a disease, such as Streptococcus in the throat, without exhibiting any symptoms. Depending on the disease, the person may or may not be contagious during the incubation period.

During latency, an infection is subclinical (also called asymptomatic). With respect to viral infections, in incubation the virus is replicating. This is in contrast to viral latency, a form of dormancy in which the virus does not replicate. An example of latency is HIV infection. HIV may at first have no symptoms and show no signs of AIDS, despite HIV replicating in the lymphatic system and rapidly accumulating a large viral load. People with HIV in this stage may be infectious.

== Intrinsic and extrinsic incubation period ==
The terms "intrinsic incubation period" and "extrinsic incubation period" are used in vector-borne diseases. The intrinsic incubation period is the time taken by an organism to complete its development in the definitive host. The extrinsic incubation period is the time taken by an organism to develop in the intermediate host.

For example, once ingested by a mosquito, malaria parasites must undergo development within the mosquito before they are infectious to humans. The time required for development in the mosquito ranges from 10 to 28 days, depending on the parasite species and the temperature. This is the extrinsic incubation period of that parasite. If a female mosquito does not survive longer than the extrinsic incubation period, then she will not be able to transmit any malaria parasites.

But if a mosquito successfully transfers the parasite to a human body via a bite, the parasite starts developing. The time between the injection of the parasite into the human and the development of the first symptoms of malaria is its intrinsic incubation period.

== Determining factors ==
The specific incubation period for a disease process is the result of multiple factors, including:

- Dose or inoculum of an infectious agent
- Route of inoculation
- Rate of replication of infectious agent
- Host susceptibility
- Immune response

== Examples for diseases in humans ==
Due to inter-individual variation, the incubation period is always expressed as a range. When possible, it is best to express the mean and the 10th and 90th percentiles, though this information is not always available.

For many conditions, incubation periods are longer in adults than they are in children or infants.

| Disease | between | and |
|---|---|---|
| Cellulitis caused by Pasteurella multocida | 0 days | 1 day |
| Chicken pox | 9 days | 21 days |
| Cholera | 0.5 days | 4.5 days |
| Common cold | 1 day | 3 days |
| COVID-19 | 2 days | 11.5/12.5/14 days |
| Dengue fever | 3 days | 14 days |
| Ebola | 1 day | 21 (95%), 42 (98%) days |
| Erythema infectiosum (Fifth disease) | 13 days | 18 days |
| Giardia | 3 days | 21 days |
| HIV | 2 weeks to months, or longer | 3 weeks to months, or longer |
| Infectious mononucleosis (glandular fever) | 28 days | 42 days |
| Influenza | 1 day | 3 days |
| Kuru disease | 10.3 years (mean) | 13.2 years |
| Leprosy | 1 year | 20 or more years |
| Marburg | 5 days | 10 days |
| Measles | 9 days | 12 days |
| MERS | 2 days | 14 days |
| Mumps | 14 days | 18 days |
| Norovirus | 1 day | 2 days |
| Pertussis (whooping cough) | 7 days | 14 days |
| Polio | 7 days | 14 days |
| Rabies | 1 month, but may vary from <1 week to rarely >1 year. | 3 months |
| Rocky Mountain spotted fever | 2 days | 14 days |
| Roseola | 5 days | 15 days |
| Rubella (German measles) | 14 days | 21 days |
| Salmonella | 12 days | 24 days |
| Scarlet fever | 1 day | 4 days |
| SARS | 1 day | 10 days |
| Smallpox | 7 days | 17 days |
| Tetanus | 7 days | 21 days |
| Tuberculosis | 2 weeks | 12 weeks |
| Typhoid | 7 days | 21 days |

== See also ==
- Latent period
- Infectious period
- Gestation period
- Prodrome
- Quarantine
- Window period, the time between infection and when lab tests can identify the infection.
