= Farr's laws =

Epidemiological observation

Farr's law is a law formulated by Dr. William Farr when he made the observation that epidemic events rise and fall in a roughly symmetrical pattern. The time-evolution behavior could be captured by a single mathematical formula that could be approximated by a bell-shaped curve.

== Background ==
In 1840, Farr submitted a letter to the Annual Report of the Registrar General of Births, Deaths and Marriages in England. In that letter, he applied mathematics to the records of deaths during a recent smallpox epidemic, proposing that:

"If the latent cause of epidemics cannot be discovered, the mode in which it operates may be investigated. The laws of its action may be determined by observation, as well as the circumstances in which epidemics arise, or by which they may be controlled."

He showed that during the smallpox epidemic, a plot of the number of deaths per quarter followed a roughly bell-shaped or normal curve, (Note: In his letter, Farr stated that during a recent smallpox epidemic, the number of deaths versus time followed a roughly normal curve: "The rates vary with the density of the population, the numbers susceptible of attack, the mortality, and the accidental circumstances; so that to obtain the mean rates applicable to the whole population, or to any portion of the population, several epidemics should be investigated. It appears probable, however, that the small-pox increases at an accelerated and then a retarded rate; that it declines first at a slightly accelerated, and at a rapidly accelerated, and lastly at a retarded rate, until the disease attains the minimum intensity, and remains stationary.") (Note: "[Farr] specially considered the decline of the [smallpox] epidemic, and fitted the figures to a curve calculated by a method described. Though he gives no equation of the form of the curve, it is quite obviously the normal curve of error.") and that recent epidemics of other diseases had followed a similar pattern. (Note: "Table (q) exhibits the progress of four more epidemic diseases in the metropolis, — measles, typhus, hooping-cough, and scarlatina, — which have not yet been effectively controlled by medical science. They exhibit the same regularity, but the laws which govern their course will be more conveniently discussed when the abstract of the observations has been extended over another year.")
