= Twindemic =

Scenario of simultaneous flu and COVID-19 cases

Twindemic and tripledemic (or tridemic) were terms used during the COVID-19 pandemic, referring to the possibility of a severe flu season happening alongside an increase in cases of COVID-19 during the fall and winter of 2020 and 2021, as well as respiratory syncytial virus in the winter of 2022. A consequence of a twindemic may be a mixture of two different infections in the same person at the same time. The term twindemic is a portmanteau of "twin" and "pandemic".

== History ==
The term was used by an August 2020 article from The New York Times written by Jan Hoffman. In the article, Hoffman credited Dr. L.J. Tan of the Immunization Action Coalition as an "early promoter" of the possibility of a twindemic. After the publication of The Times' article, several media outlets began to report on the possibility of a twindemic. Health experts responded to the threat of a possible twindemic by encouraging more people to get the flu vaccine.

A twindemic did not occur during the flu season in late 2020 due to cases of the seasonal flu being at historic lows in the United States and globally. These low amount of flu cases were attributed to measures put in place to prevent COVID-19 from spreading, including face masks, social distancing, and hand washing.

Health experts renewed concerns of a possible twindemic happening during the fall and winter of 2021 due to loosening restrictions. In April 2022, Apoorva Mandavilli of The New York Times speculated that a twindemic has not occurred because "exposure to one respiratory virus may put the body's immune defenses on high alert, barring other intruders from gaining entry into the airways. This biological phenomenon, called viral interference, may cap the amount of respiratory virus circulating in a region at any given time." In the United States, flu cases, hospitalizations and deaths were up from the previous flu season, but were still lower than the pre-pandemic average.

== "Flurona" or "Flucovid" ==
In January 2022, Israel reported, for the first time, a mixture of COVID-19 and influenza infections, colloquially known as "flurona". In Brazil, four cases of the double infection were identified, including a 16-year-old male from Rio de Janeiro. In Fortaleza of Ceará state, two children, including a one-year-old child tested positive without complications, and also a 52-year-old man who did not need hospitalization. In São Paulo, the Secretariat of Health announced that its state had 110 cases in 2021.

Flurona infections have also been reported in the United States, the Philippines, Hungary and Romania.

In June 2022, a study proposed the term "Flucovid" which presents itself with severe overlapping symptoms of COVID-19 and the flu. It is synonymous to the term "Flurona". Both of which describe a coinfection of the two.
