= Serial interval =

Time of transmission of an infectious disease

The serial interval in the epidemiology of communicable (infectious) diseases is the time between successive cases in a chain of transmission.

The serial interval is generally estimated from the interval between clinical onsets (if observable), in which case it is the 'clinical onset serial interval'. It could in principle be estimated by the time interval between infection and subsequent transmission. If the typical time from the first person's clinical onset to when they infect another is TA, and the incubation period of a subsequent case is IB, then the clinical onset serial interval is TA + IB. More realistically, the calculation would use the observed frequency distribution of times from onset of a single primary case to that of its associated secondary cases. If the distribution of timing of transmission events during the infectious period is not skewed around its mean, then the average serial interval is calculated as the sum of the average latent period (from infection to infectiousness) and half the average infectious period.

Serial intervals can vary widely, especially for lifelong diseases such as HIV infection, chickenpox, and herpes. The serial interval for SARS was 7 days. For the original strain of COVID-19, a 2020 review of the published literature shows its serial interval to be 4-8 days.

Related but distinct quantities include the 'average transmission interval' sum of average latent and infectious period, the 'incubation period' between infection and disease onset, and the 'latent period' between infection and infectiousness.
