= Antibody testing =

Antibody testing may refer to:

- Serological testing, tests that detect specific antibodies in the blood
- Immunoassay, tests that use antibodies to detect substances
- Antibody titer, tests that measure the amount of a specific antibody in a sample
