= Timeline of the COVID-19 pandemic in Australia (January–June 2021) =

This article documents the chronology and epidemiology of SARS-CoV-2, the virus which causes the coronavirus disease 2019 (COVID-19) and is responsible for the COVID-19 pandemic in Australia during the first half of 2021.

== January 2021 ==
New Year celebrations, such as the fireworks on Sydney Harbour, when they were held, were mostly considerably reduced due to restrictions introduced to prevent crowds gathering. Melbourne, Canberra, Brisbane (and the Gold Coast), and Adelaide cancelled their official New Year's fireworks. In Sydney, access to the city, and the CBD in particular, was restricted, foreshore access was not permitted. The 9 pm display was cancelled, the usually boat crowded harbour was largely empty, and the midnight fireworks were reduced to seven minutes. Those attending hospitality venues required a pass to access harbourside areas. At homes, only five visitors were allowed. In regional South Australia firework displays were still held in Victor Harbor, Port Lincoln and Murray Bridge. In Brisbane some hospitality venues hosted private fireworks, but they were paid, ticketed events.

As the Northern Territory made it through the year with no community transmission, Darwin celebrated with some of the "most relaxed coronavirus restrictions" in Australia. Two 10-minute firework shows were held at the Darwin Waterfront Precinct. Patrons had to register on-line, pay A$20, and there were no door sales. About 10,000 people attended the waterfront. Organisers claimed that, as more NT residents were holidaying locally, and interstate tourists had travelled north to avoid interstate restrictions, the event was bigger than previously. Perth also enjoyed a relatively normal New Year's Eve due to Western Australia's, then, community transmission free status. There was a 9 pm family display, and 5 minutes at midnight. People were encouraged to follow normal COVID safe rules, and register on the SafeWA app at events. In Hobart, the Taste of Tasmania food and wine festival had been cancelled, so the usually busy CBD was unusually quiet. Two firework displays were still held on the Derwent River. Large crowds could not congregate as outside gatherings were restricted to 1,000.

In early 2021 in Canberra, that years previously postponed National Multicultural Festival, was cancelled entirely.

On 2 January, NSW Premier Gladys Berejiklian announced that face masks would become mandatory in many indoor venues in Greater Sydney, Central Coast and Wollongong, (Note: "Greater Sydney, Central Coast and Wollongong", as defined by the NSW Government, includes the local government areas of • Bayside, Blacktown, Blue Mountains, Burwood, Camden, Campbelltown, Canada Bay, Canterbury-Bankstown, Cumberland, Fairfield, Georges River, Hawkesbury, The Hills Shire, Hornsby, Hunter's Hill, Inner West, Ku–ring–gai, Lane Cove, Liverpool, Mosman, North Sydney, Northern Beaches, Parramatta, Penrith, Randwick, Ryde, Strathfield, Sutherland Shire, Sydney, Waverley, Willoughby, Wollondilly, Woollahra • Central Coast • Wollongong) including supermarkets, places of worship and public transport, from 3 January. A$200 on-the-spot fines were given to non-compliant individuals from 4 January. People exempt to the mandate included children under the age of 12.

Berejiklian also announced that gym classes must have a maximum size of 30 people, places of worship must only welcome a maximum of 100 worshippers and one person every four square metres, and weddings and funerals limited to 100 attendees or one person per four square metres. She also said that outdoor performances must only have 500 people in attendance while events which were "seated, ticketed and enclosed" were reduced back to a maximum capacity of 2,000. Night clubs were not allowed to operate.

On 3 January, NSW Chief Health Officer Kerry Chant revealed that results of genomic testing concluded that cases in Berala were not linked to cases in the Northern Beaches.

Also on 3 January, an anti-mask protest was held inside Westfield Bondi Junction. This was the first day that new mask wearing requirements, including venues like shopping centres, came into effect.

On 5 January, NSW Acting Premier John Barilaro warned that an individual diagnosed with COVID-19 had travelled to Orange, Broken Hill and Nyngan. He urged people who attended certain venues in those towns to monitor for symptoms and to get tested.

On the same day, Qantas announced that it had moved the resumption date of ticket sales for international flights to 1 July. Transport Minister Michael McCormack responded by saying that "decisions about when international travel resumes will be made by the Australian government".

On 6 January, NSW Health Minister Brad Hazzard announced that all spectators of the Third Test at Sydney Cricket Ground would have to wear a face mask, except when consuming food or drink.

On the same day, some health experts called for Australia's international borders to be strengthened or even closed again due to increasing concern about a COVID-19 strain, the Variant of Concern 202012/01, which was first identified in Kent, United Kingdom. Victorian Deputy Chief Health Officer Allan Cheng had raised the issue with the Australian Health Protection Principal Committee. Dr Tony Blakely, an epidemiologist from the University of Melbourne said Australia needed to "close the border or strengthen it as much as we possibly can". Professor Damian Purcell from the Department of Microbiology and Immunology at the Peter Doherty Institute, said Australians "don't need to be terrified" of expected coronavirus mutations. After the strain was found in quarantined travellers in Melbourne, the Victorian Government said it was considering banning travellers from the UK. That afternoon, Prime Minister Scott Morrison posted on Facebook to announce that he would "convene a special meeting of National Cabinet" on 8 January. He said that it would be to discuss a proposal to strengthen international travel procedures, "particularly in the context of the UK strain".

Victorian Acting Premier Jacinta Allan announced a "pause" in changes to workers returning to the workplace. Up to 50% of Victorian employees were initially planned to be allowed to work in the office.

On 7 January, Australian Prime Minister Morrison announced that they would bring forward the rollout of the Pfizer–BioNTech COVID-19 vaccine to February. He said workers dealing with international arrivals, hotel quarantine workers, frontline healthcare workers, and workers and residents in aged care and disability care would receive the vaccine first.

Meanwhile, Queensland Premier Annastacia Palaszczuk announced that a hotel quarantine cleaner had contracted COVID-19. It was later confirmed that she was infected with the Variant of Concern 202012/01. In response, Queensland Chief Health Officer Jeannette Young announced immediate restrictions to visitors to certain facilities, including aged care and hospitals, in the Metro North, Metro South and West Moreton Hospital and Health Service regions.

On 8 January, National Cabinet met and agreed to major changes to international air travel arrangements. These included halving the weekly cap of international arrivals to 1,500 in NSW and 500 in WA and Queensland until 15 February, as well as mandating that all international travellers test negative for COVID-19 before flying to Australia. Masks were also made mandatory for all passengers and crew on domestic and international flights and in airports, with few exemptions.

On the same day, Queensland Premier Palaszczuk announced a three-day lockdown for all of Greater Brisbane. (Note: "Greater Brisbane", as defined by the Queensland Government, includes the local government areas of • City of Brisbane, City of Ipswich, Logan City, Moreton Bay Region, City of Redland) In response, NSW told Queenslanders to isolate while SA declared Greater Brisbane a hotspot. Tasmania declared Greater Brisbane as "high risk" while WA implemented a hard border with Queensland.

On 13 January the cancelled Summernats "replacement" event, the Summernats Rev Rock 'n' Roll festival that was planned to run over the 5–7 March 2021 Canberra Day long weekend, was also cancelled.

On 15 January the airline Emirates announced it was indefinitely suspending all flights to, or from, Brisbane, Sydney, and Melbourne. However, within a week Emirates announced that it would resume the cancelled routes. In the interim, cargo operations to all Australian airports, and flights between Dubai and Perth, continued.

On 16 January the Federal government announced 20 repatriation flights to return Australian citizens stranded overseas. The flights will be from 31 January to 31 March. The number of people returned will be in addition to existing caps on international flight arrivals. As of 15 January 2021 over 37,000 Australians were stranded abroad.

On 23 January an anti-mask protest was stopped by police from entering the Westfield Parramatta shopping centre. Warning was given to the group to obey public health orders, and follow social distancing guidelines. One man was arrested when he did not comply with the police directive when the group dispersed after they were given a move-on direction. A protest group was also turned away a week earlier.

On 25 January, the Federal government suspended the trans-Tasman travel bubble operating since 16 October 2020. This removed the ability of New Zealanders to travel to Australia, without quarantining, for at least 72 hours. This followed the discovery of a NZ resident with the South African COVID-19 variant. The woman was not known to be infectious, having twice tested negative to COVID-19 before leaving quarantine, then visited many places in northern NZ, but was then found to have the new strain.

On 28 January the ban on travel from NZ without quarantine was extended for 3 more days.

On 29 January 2021, the ability of Australians stuck overseas to fly back to Australia was further hampered when the UK banned direct flights from the United Arab Emirates (UAE) over the possible spread of the South African COVID-19 variant. Both Etihad and Emirates airlines are UAE based, and major carriers between the UK and Australia.

=== Western Australian lockdown ===
On 31 January, a quarantine hotel security guard at the Four Points by Sheraton in Perth tested positive. A five-day lockdown, from 6 pm on 31 January (Sunday) until 6 pm on 5 February (Friday) was declared. Schools remained closed for another week after being scheduled to resume on 1 February.

Beginning at 6:00 pm tonight the whole Perth metropolitan area, the Peel region and the South West region will be going into full lockdown.

— WA Premier Mark McGowan

The guard's infection ended a ten-month period of no community transmission in Western Australia (WA). Approximately 2 million people in WA were affected by the lockdown.

Federal politicians from WA flying into Canberra had to quarantine for five-days when the lockdown was declared. Parliament was to resume on 2 February, so some MPs were unable to physically attend the first week.

In response to the lockdown, health authorities in the Australian Capital Territory, Queensland, the Northern Territory and Victoria declared the affected areas to be COVID-19 hotspots.

- The ACT ordered anyone who had been to Perth's metropolitan area since 25 January to get tested, and enter a five-day self-quarantine.
- Queensland required 2 weeks of hotel quarantine for any new arrivals who had been in the locked down areas. Those already in Queensland, but who had been in a WA hotspot area since 26 January, had to be tested and isolate until receiving a negative result.
- Travellers to the NT from WA hotspots underwent 14 days of mandatory supervised quarantine.
- Victoria did not allow entry to anyone who was in any of the WA red zones since 25 January without an exception, exemption or permitted worker permit.
- South Australia did not immediately close its border with WA, but airline passengers from WA arriving in Adelaide were told to self-quarantine, and get a COVID-19 test on days one, five and twelve.

The lockdown was lifted on 5 February, but some rules, such as mandatory mask wearing, were maintained in the Peel and Perth regions. The last lockdown specific restrictions were lifted at 12:01 a.m. on 14 February.

== February 2021 ==
On 1 February, Queensland opened its border to all states except Western Australia. Since border closure 6,855,750 border passes were issued.

On 2 February, responding to the WA lockdown, New South Wales ordered more than 1,100 people who had visited affected areas in WA since 25 January into five days of lockdown. They had to adhere to the same restrictions as if they had stayed in WA. Any arrivals from WA must have a COVID-19 test within 48 hours, or undergo 14 days of quarantine.

Also on 2 February the Ellume company of Brisbane received a contract worth A$302 million (US$230 million) from the United States Department of Defense to provide at-home COVID-19 testing kits. The "Ellume COVID-19 Home Test" is the first at-home COVID-19 test to get emergency approval from the US Food and Drug Administration. The company claims its test can be done in 15 minutes and is around 95% accurate.

On 3 February in Victoria, a quarantine hotel worker at the Grand Hyatt Melbourne, a "resident support officer" involved in the Australian Open tennis quarantine program, was found to have COVID-19. From 11:59 pm Victoria immediately reintroduced some rules, tightened some, and put off imminent easing of some restrictions. The plan to, from 8 February (Monday), allow up to 75 per cent of office workers back into their workplaces was put on hold. Masks were mandatory inside, and only 15 persons are allowed at private events. The man visited a number of businesses from 29 January to 1 February, but was able to give contact tracers a detailed list of places and times. Anyone who was at those places at those times, must be tested, and isolate for 14 days. Testing site hours were extended from 4 February, opening at 8 am. More drive-through lanes were added, and additional testing sites opened.

On 4 February, the Northern Territory declared ten suburbs in Melbourne to be hotspots. Arrivals into NT from Melbourne, West Melbourne, Noble Park, Keysborough, Springvale, Brighton, Wheelers Hill, Clayton South, Heatherton or Moorabbin will be required to go into mandatory quarantine for 14 days. Those already in NT who have been in any of the hotspots since 29 January will also have to self-isolate until their COVID-19 testing is negative.

By 5 February, genomic sequencing confirmed that the Melbourne Grand Hyatt worker was infected with the more contagious "UK strain" of COVID-19. Also on 5 February 2021, National Cabinet decided to increase the number of international passenger arrivals to Australia as from 15 February. New South Wales will return from 1,505 to a weekly cap of 3,010 people and Queensland from 500 to 1,000. South Australia has increased from 490 a week to 530, and Victoria from 1,120 to 1,310. Western Australia will remain at a reduced arrival cap of 512. The total national weekly cap of 4,127 will increase to 6,362. It was 6,645 on 15 January, when the cap was cut as a response to the UK strain of coronavirus. Repatriation flights to: the Howard Springs facility in the Northern Territory; Canberra; and Hobart are additional to the caps.

Also on 5 February, the WA lockdown was lifted, though some rules such as mandatory mask wearing were kept. Travel restrictions also still applied to Peel and Perth, but not the North Western region. That day, Premier McGowan also announced a A$43 million package to assist small businesses and charities who suffered financially during the lockdown in the form of a A$500 offset on their electricity bill. Chief executive of The Australian Hotels Association (AHA) WA, Bradley Woods said: "We estimate over $100 million revenue and sales has been lost as a result of this shutdown …". Plans to increase WA's weekly international flight arrival cap were postponed to the end of February.

Holiday Inn outbreak

On 10 February, a quarantine hotel at Melbourne airport was evacuated. The Holiday Inn was emptied after hotel quarantine workers were found to have been infected with COVID-19, though no breach of protective equipment use or procedures was found. It is believed that an returned traveller, with pre-existing health conditions, used a nebuliser, which increased the chance of the virus spreading by air. By 12 February, the cluster had grown to 14, by the 16th the cluster had increased to 19. By the 19th the outbreak had increased to 22 and one person was in intensive care. That morning, about 3,515 "primary close contacts" that are linked to the outbreak were in quarantine.

On 11 February, the airline Cathay Pacific decided that, excepting Sydney, from 20 February it would temporarily cease all flights to Australia until the end of the month. This was a response to the Hong Kong government's new COVID restrictions requiring Hong Kong based aircrew to quarantine. Also on 11 February, trials of the "Dine and Discover NSW" economic stimulus vouchers began in Broken Hill, and The Rocks in Sydney. Full roll-out is scheduled for March.

On 12 February Victoria announced that it would again enter lockdown across the entire state for 5 days from 11:59 pm that night. This was in response to the Melbourne Airport Holiday Inn quarantine hotel outbreak. By 12 February, the Holiday Inn cluster had grown to 14. The Australian Open tennis competition continued, but without any spectators. This will apply to all professional sporting events. In response all other states and territories placed travel restrictions upon Victoria.

The same day the new Victorian lockdown started, in Melbourne the Moomba Festival was cancelled for the first time. However within a week an alternative event, "Moomba 2.0", was created. Instead of the usual attractions, Lord Mayor Sally Capp said Moomba 2.0 will be: "... a series of fun, family friendly events and attractions across the city that will help bring the buzz back to Melbourne."

Also on 12 February 2021, the 16th World Solar Challenge, due to run from 22 to 30 October, was cancelled by the SA Government.

On 14 February, the final WA post-31 January lockdown restrictions, including mandatory masks, were lifted in the Perth and Peel regions after 14 days. WA Premier McGowan said since January more than 102,000 COVID-19 tests had been done. There were no new COVID-19 cases detected overnight in WA, and only 5 cases in hotel quarantine.

On 15 February, the first 142,000 doses of the Pfizer–BioNTech COVID-19 vaccine arrived in Australia. The first doses were due be administered on 22 February. The Australian Government has purchased 10 million doses of this vaccine.

By 16 February, the number of confirmed infections linked to the Melbourne Holiday Inn outbreak had increased to 19. The same day, the Oxford–AstraZeneca COVID-19 vaccine, was approved by the Therapeutic Goods Administration (TGA) "… for use in people aged over 18 years".

Also on 16 February, the first vials of COVID-19 vaccine produced in Australia came off the production line at the CSL Behring plant in Broadmeadows, Melbourne.

On 17 February Canberra's public health emergency declaration was extended 90 days to 18 May 2021.

Also on 17 February the 5-day lockdown in Victoria was lifted at 11:59 pm. Despite this, Victoria will not allow any incoming international flights "indefinitely".

On 18 February, there were no new locally acquired COVID-19 cases in the Australian Capital Territory, New South Wales, Queensland, South Australia or Victoria.

By 19 February, the Melbourne Holiday Inn outbreak had increased to 22. One person was admitted to intensive care and about 3,515 contacts were quarantined. Also on this day, after the Moomba Festival was cancelled on 12 February, the replacement Moomba 2.0 events were announced.

On 20 February anti-COVID-19 vaccine rallies were held in Adelaide, Brisbane, Melbourne, Perth and Sydney. There were a few hundred people at each.

Also on 20 February, New Zealanders were again able to come to Australia without needing to quarantine on arrival. If they have been in Auckland in the 14 days before travelling they will need a negative COVID-19 test less than 3-day before travelling. The "travel bubble" only applies to entry to Australia.

Vaccinations start

On 21 February, the first public COVID-19 vaccinations in Australia, with the Pfizer–BioNTech vaccine, were administered in Sydney. An 84-year-old aged care resident was the first Australian to receive the vaccine. To show confidence in the national immunisation vaccine rollout, Prime Minister Morrison, and Australia's Chief Medical Officer Professor Paul Kelly, also received vaccinations. Up to 6:00 pm on 23 February in NSW, 3,200 people were immunised across three state-run hospitals.

On 22 February 2021, the first Canberran received a COVID-19 vaccination. She was a 22-year-old registered nurse, and a member of a COVID-19 testing team. The same day the first Queenslander received a vaccination at Gold Coast University Hospital. She was a nurse who works in that hospitals COVID-19 ward.

On 23 February 2021, 166,000 more doses of the Pfizer vaccine, Australia's second shipment, arrived at Sydney airport. 120,000 more doses are due to arrive in the following week.

On 24 February, further restrictions eases were announced in NSW. From 12:01 am on 26 February (Friday):

- Dancing and singing will be allowed at gatherings
- At weddings, up to 30 people, including guests, can dance at one time. (currently, only the wedding party, a maximum of 20 people. The 300 person limit for wedding guests remains for now)
- Up to 50 people at their home (up from 30) Visitor number includes adults and children.
- Up to 50 people allowed in gym classes (4-square metre rule applies)
- Up to 30 singers allowed in choirs and religious congregations. Masks required, place of worship must adhere to the 4-square metre rule

Also, as of 24 February, there has been no transmission of COVID-19 in the community in NSW for 38 days. On 17 March restrictions will be "revisited".

The same day, 24 February, Queensland State Chief Health Officer Jeannette Young announced that the state had halted its travel bubble arrangement with New Zealand in response to a recent community outbreak in South Auckland. From 9 pm (NZ time), New Zealanders traveling to Queensland would have to enter quarantine.

On 25 February, Qantas said it intends to resume international Qantas and Jetstar flights on 21 October, which was originally planned for July. Qantas also reported a half-year revenue loss of A$1.08 billion. Revenue fell by 75 per cent to A$2.3 billion, passenger numbers fell by 83 per cent.

On 26 February the Chief Executive of the Australian Airports Association, James Goodwin, said that Australian airports had been losing A$320 million every month during the coronavirus pandemic. He also said over the past 12 months, job losses amounted to 25 per cent of the airports' workforce.

On 28 February 2021, 300,000 doses of the Oxford-AstraZeneca vaccine arrived at Sydney airport. The same day in Queensland the "Check in Qld" QR code sign-in/contact tracing app was launched by the Minister for Health and Ambulance Services, Yvette D'Ath. Use of the app is not mandatory.

== March 2021 ==
On 2 March, the general closure of Australia's international borders to travel was extended to 17 June 2021. Australia's borders have now been closed for 12 months. Despite the border closure, between 25 March and 31 December 2020 over 105,000 exemptions were approved for people to leave Australia.

On 4 March a health worker in Queensland experienced a serious anaphylactic reaction after receiving the Pfizer vaccine and was admitted into intensive care. The person had a history of anaphylaxis. They made a full recovery on the same day and were discharged from hospital.

On 5 March 250,000 doses of the Oxford-AstraZeneca vaccine from Italy headed to Australia, were not permitted to be exported by Italy and the European Union. The same day, the first Australian to receive that vaccine was at Murray Bridge, South Australia. The recipient was a doctor in regional South Australia.

On 10 March 2021 the Federal Government announced steps worth A$1.2 billion to encourage Australians to holiday within Australia to assist ailing tourist destinations. Between April and July, up to 800,000 airfares to 13 regions normally favoured by international tourists will be halved for domestic travellers.

On 12 March Princess Alexandra Hospital in Brisbane went into lockdown after a doctor tested positive for COVID-19. Queensland had gone 59 days without any locally acquired COVID-19 infections.

On 17 March Prime Minister Morrison proposed that one million of Australia's doses of the Oxford-AstraZeneca vaccine be diverted to Papua-New Guinea (PNG) as that neighbouring country was under an "... out-of-control second COVID-19 wave, " and "... facing a humanitarian crisis". Other measures include sending personal protective equipment and suspending flights from Cairns to PNG.

On 21 March production of the Oxford-AstraZeneca COVID-19 vaccine in Australia was approved by Australia's Therapeutic Goods Administration.

On 29 March at 5 pm Greater Brisbane went into a 3-day lockdown. The step was taken when a cluster of the UK strain of COVID-19 grew to 7 people. The lockdown ended early at midday on 1 April. Also on 29 March, the JobKeeper wage subsidy ended.

By 30 March in Queensland, another 8 locally acquired cases were reported for a total of 10 new cases in the preceding 24 hours, and 2 separate clusters, both of the UK strain were identified. As of this date Queensland had 78 active cases in hospitals.

On 31 March in Queensland 34,711 coronavirus tests and 7,596 vaccinations were conducted.

== April 2021 ==
On 1 April in Brisbane, the "3 day" lockdown from 29 March, due to end at 5 pm, was lifted at midday. Ten new cases were recorded in the previous 24 hours, but only one case of community transmission, which is linked to a cluster from an infected nurse at the Princess Alexandra Hospital. This cluster now numbered 12, up from 7 on 29 March. Some restrictions introduced for the lockdown will be maintained:

- all Queenslanders will have to carry a face-mask outside their home until 15 April.
- patrons at food or beverage venues must stay seated, no dancing allowed
- 30 person limit at private gatherings at homes statewide.
- Businesses and churches can open, but must have only one-person-per 2-square-metres of floor area.
- Visitors are not permitted for 2 weeks at: aged or disabled care facilities, hospitals and prisons.

On 2 April a 44-year-old Victorian man was admitted to Melbourne's Box Hill Hospital when he developed serious thrombosis and a low platelet count after receiving the Oxford-AstraZeneca vaccine on 22 March. He developed blood clots in his spleen, liver and gut. The Therapeutic Goods Administration warned anyone who experienced persistent headaches or other worrying symptoms 4 to 20 days after receiving the vaccine to seek medical advice. Another case of clotting linked to this vaccine was reported on 13 April.

On 5 April, Malcolm Kela Smith, a British born Papua New Guinean, businessman, aviator and politician died aged 77-years from complications of COVID-19 while under treatment in the intensive care unit at Redcliffe Hospital in Queensland, Australia.

On 8 April 2021 the Australian Technical Advisory Group on Immunisation (ATAGI) and the TGA met to review concerns over the AstraZeneca vaccine. Australia's Chief Medical Officer, Paul Kelly, reassured about the safety of the vaccine, but it was being reviewed. ATAGI advised the Federal Government to use the AstraZeneca vaccine only for those over 50-years-of-age as they confirmed the rare side-effect of blood clotting could occur in younger people.

On 12 April an 80-year-old Australian man, who had been living in the Philippines but returned to Australia, died from COVID-19 in Queensland. It was the seventh death of a person who had been diagnosed with the virus in the state, and first COVID-19 death recorded in the state since an 83-year-old cruise ship passenger died in April 2020 in a Sydney hospital.

On 13 April a second case of blood clotting, in a Western Australian women in her 40s, was linked to the Oxford-AstraZeneca COVID-19 vaccine.

On 15 April, a diabetic 48-year-old New South Wales woman died in John Hunter Hospital after developing thrombosis with thrombocytopenia 4 days after being vaccinated with the Oxford-AstraZeneca vaccine. The TGA said it was "likely" her death was linked to the vaccination.

On 19 April, a 'travel bubble' between Australia and New Zealand opened. Australians are able travel to New Zealand and not have to quarantine on return, for the first time since the start of the COVID-19 pandemic.

On 21 April a 40-year-old man was admitted to a private hospital in Queensland with blood clots, the fourth reported case, after he was vaccinated with the Pfizer vaccine on 18 April. Investigations are underway to confirm the link between the vaccine and the clotting.

On 23 April, Prime Minister Morrison announced that travellers to Australia from "high risk" countries, in particular India, were to be reduced by 30 percent. This decision is based on an increase in positive results for COVID-19 among travellers from India at the Howard Springs, Northern Territory quarantine facility. Travel to such countries is also to be limited. On 27 April, due to an ongoing outbreak of COVID-19 in India, all incoming flights from there were "paused" until at least 15 May.

Also on 23 April in Western Australia, Perth city and the Peel region went to into a 3-day lockdown from midnight after two cases of COVID-19 transmission inside the Mercure quarantine hotel. The outbreak originated from a man who quarantined after he travelled to India to get married. Anzac Day services in the affected areas were cancelled. In response to the lockdown, Air New Zealand canceled a flight between Auckland and Perth. The lockdown ended on 26 April.

Still on 23 April 2021, 3 more cases of blood clotting were reported that are believed to be linked to AstraZeneca vaccination. A 49-year-old Queensland man, an 80-year-old Victorian man and 35-year-old NSW woman all had suspected thrombosis with thrombocytopenia syndrome (TTS). The TGA said there was a "likely link" as all three had received the AstraZeneca vaccine. All were in a stable condition and recovering.

On 26 April the lockdown in WA ended as scheduled with no new case of community transmission. Travel beyond the Perth and Peel areas was allowed but for the following four days, some restrictions remained in force:

- Mandatory face masks in public
- Indoor fitness venues, nightclubs and the casino remained closed,
- Venues including restaurants, pubs and cafes reopened, however:
  - The four-square-metre area capacity rule applied,
  - A limit of 20 patrons, not including staff.
- Private gatherings, both indoor and outdoor were limited 20 people.
- Visits to hospitals, aged care and disability care facilities were restricted to compassionate grounds only.
- Community sport allowed, but:
  - Without spectators,
  - Capacity limits for indoor venues.
- Universities will only be open for online learning.

On 27 April, due to the "record breaking" outbreak of COVID-19 in India, with 323,000 new infections that day after five days with new cases peaking above 350,000, and another 2,771 COVID deaths there, the Federal Government "paused" all incoming flights from there until at least 15 May. The pause includes repatriation flights into the Howard Springs quarantine facility near Darwin with more than 9,000 Australians in India at this date wanting to come to Australia. Australia will send medical aid to India in the form of ventilators, surgical masks, P2 and N95 masks, goggles, gloves and face shields.

By 28 April more than 2 million COVID-19 vaccinations had been administered, but this was 3 million short of original plans.

On 29 April a report was released on a review of at-border delivery of human biosecurity functions in regard to the Ruby Princess incident. Following a NSW Police Force investigation, and a NSW Special Commission of inquiry, the Commonwealth Inspector-General of Biosecurity also conducted a review of biosecurity functions in regard to the incident. His report found, among other findings, that inspection protocols were not followed as unwell passengers on the Ruby Princess should have been screened individually by following a checklist, but this was not done. The report made over 40 recommendations to improve Australia's human biosecurity management on ships.

On 30 April in South Australia, a COVID-19 mass vaccination hub opened at Adelaide Showground.

== May 2021 ==
On 1 May, a male guard at the Pan Pacific quarantine hotel in Perth, tested positive to COVID-19. He had already received his first dose of COVID vaccine. 2 of his 7 housemates, both food delivery drivers, then tested positive. While likely to have been infectious, the guard visited several locations in the community, raising the possibility of another lockdown in Western Australia. It is not known how the guard became infected, but he worked at the hotel on 24, 25 and 26 April, including on the same floor as two returned travellers who were COVID-19 positive. One result was that spectators were not allowed at the Western AFL Derby on 2 May at Optus Stadium. Prior to the guard's infection, up to 45,000 people were to be allowed to attend. On Sunday 2 May, WA Premier McGowan also announced a number of new restrictions, including that nightclubs were to be closed immediately. Those and the casino gaming floor remained shut until at least 12.01 am on Saturday May 8. Under the restrictions, masks remained mandatory indoors and outdoors in the Perth and Peel regions, unless people had a medical exemption, or were doing vigorous exercise outside. This included those who had been in Perth or Peel since April 17. On 3 May another lockdown was still a possibility.

On 5 May in Sydney, a case of COVID-19 in a man in his 50s was detected with no known physical link to travel or border control/quarantine hotels or workers. Genomic testing provided a link to an overseas (US) acquired infection at the Park Royal in Darling Harbour. The new case is believed to have been infectious while visiting at least 20 locations in Sydney from 30 April to 4 May. His wife also tested positive to COVID-19. Owing to these new cases, COVID related restrictions in Greater Sydney, the Blue Mountains and Wollongong, were tightened, initially for 3 days from 5 pm on 6 May (Friday), to 12:01 am on 9 May (Monday).

- Mask-wearing was made mandatory at indoor places for three days, including:
  - Public transport
  - Supermarkets
  - Other indoor events
- Hospitality staff at front of house also had to be masked
  - Patrons drinking had to be seated.
- No singing or dancing allowed at indoor venues, including,
  - Places of worship and
  - Entertainment venues.

Exemptions included weddings, and dancers or singers performing in shows.

- Only 20 visitors allowed at private homes
- Maximum 2 visitors at aged care facilities

Most of these restrictions were later extended to 17 May.

Also on 5 May, in Victoria, the COVID-19 Quarantine Victoria general manager of infection control, Matius Bush, was stood down by the Minister for Government Services Danny Pearson pending a conduct review. Bush breached infection controls twice by: refusing a COVID test at a quarantine hotel when requested by Defence personnel; and failing to sanitise or change his mask when returning to a quarantine hotel from a coffee shop.

By 6 May, another 5 cases of thrombosis with thrombocytopenia syndrome (TTS) linked to AstraZeneca COVID-19 vaccination had been reported, bringing the total to 11.

On 9 May in NSW, because the "missing link" in two infections there had not been located, most of the restrictions tightened on 5 May were extended another seven days until 12:01 am on 17 May. The main change was mask wearing was not required indoors by patrons of shops and hospitality venues, except for gaming areas where masks were still needed. On public transport and other indoor public venues masks remained mandatory.

Also on 9 May, Victoria had 72 days of no recorded cases of community transmission of COVID-19. In NSW, 13,768 tests were undertaken in the 24 hours to 8:00pm on 9 May, but NSW recorded no locally acquired COVID-19 infections.

On 10 May in NSW, a mass vaccination hub opened at Sydney Olympic Park. The same day, registrations began for NSW residents aged 40 to 49 to receive the Pfizer COVID-19 vaccine.

On 13 May, it was announced that the US Moderna company had an agreement with the Australian Federal government to provide 25 million doses of its COVID-19 vaccine 'mRNA-1273', subject to TGA approval.

On 17 May in Sydney, the temporary restrictions introduced on 5 May were removed. The missing link in the 2 cases of community transmission that led to these restrictions had not been located by this day.

On 23 May, an expanded ChooseCBR voucher scheme was announced in the ACT. Bigger discounts were offered and more money was allocated. The new scheme proved popular when launched on 9 June, but its website crashed and the scheme was suspended a week.

On 24 May in northern Melbourne, 4 cases of COVID-19 in the community were reported. Another 5 community cases, for a total of 9, were reported on 25 May. 4 of them are family contacts of a man, who may be the source of the outbreak, who tested positive on 2 May. As a result, restrictions in Greater Melbourne were again tightened from 6pm on Tuesday, 25 May, to at least Friday, 4 June. Restrictions included: mandatory wearing of masks indoors (children under 12 exempted), private gatherings limited to 5 people, public gatherings limited to 30 people, limits on visitors to hospitals and aged care reinstated, Melbourne residents were allowed to travel out of the city but had to observe restrictions as if they were still in Melbourne. No changes were made to the number of people allowed in workplaces, shops, bars, or beauty services. Relaxation of "density caps" in hospitality venues had been planned, but was put on hold. Cultural and sports event were still allowed, but the AFL "paused" ticket sales for Victorian-based games.

By 27 May the Victorian outbreak had risen to 26 cases. There were over 150 exposure sites across Melbourne, and 11,000 contacts had been linked through contact tracing to the outbreak. As a result of the growing outbreak Victoria entered its fourth lockdown, statewide, as of 11:59 pm on 27 May, initially for seven days until 11:59pm on Thursday 3 June, but the lockdown was later extended another 7 days. Owing to the outbreak, all Australian states imposed a range of restrictions on travellers from Victoria, either banning entry, only allowing state residents back in, requiring home isolation for 7 days under Victoria's rules, 14 days hotel quarantine, or other measures. New Zealand paused the travel bubble with Victoria from 7:59pm on 25 May. On 10 June, at 11:59 pm, the lockdown ended though some restrictions, such as travel limits (though expanded to 25 km), remained in force.

On 28 May there were anti-lockdown protests in Melbourne.

== June 2021 ==
By 1 June the number of cases in the Victorian outbreak had reached 60. The same day, it was found that a now confirmed COVID-19 case from Melbourne had travelled to New South Wales (NSW), before the 27 May lockdown, while possibly infectious. Possible exposure sites included venues in Goulburn, Jervis Bay, Hyams Beach and Vincentia.

On 2 June the 7 day Victorian lockdown was extended for another 7 days. Some restrictions were eased, the 5 km limit was extended to 10 km, school attendance allowed for years 11 and 12, authorised work included some outdoors work. Use of the Service Victoria QR code check-in required across Victoria for places like supermarkets and shops.

On 3 June the Federal Government announced that people who lose work as a result of lockdowns, of at least 7 days length, may be eligible for a A$325 or A$500 per week Temporary COVID Disaster Payment.

Also on 3 June, the Victorian outbreak rose to 63 cases, all in Greater Melbourne. From 11:59pm that day some lockdown restrictions in regional Victoria were eased, movement in regional areas was unrestricted. The same day the stay-at-home order from NSW Health, for anyone who has been in Victoria since May 27, was extended by a week.

By 6 June, over 5 million doses of COVID-19 vaccine had been administered across Australia. Approximately 4.45 million were first doses, and nearly 570 thousand were second doses.

By June 7, there were 81 active COVID cases in the Victorian outbreaks. There were also 3 separate clusters with unknown sources in the state by then: 32 cases in Whittlesea; 9 at the Arcare aged care centre in Maidstone; and 14 at a cluster in West Melbourne. The West Melbourne cluster was found to be of the fast spreading delta COVID variant, raising the possibility the fourth Victorian lockdown could be extended again. Also on 7 June, the Victorian government announced A$30 million of financial support for residents "locked out of work" by COVID lockdowns. They also extended their emergency "hardship support payment" to October. This helps those on temporary or provisional visas who are not able get income from the Commonwealth.

On 9 June, the New South Wales Dine & Discover NSW voucher scheme was extended by a month to 31 July 2021. The same day in Canberra the expanded ChooseCBR voucher stimulus scheme was launched. The new scheme proved popular but its website crashed after two days and the scheme was suspended a week to fix "technical issues".

By 10 June a second Australian had died of thrombosis with thrombocytopenia syndrome (TTS). The 52-year-old NSW woman had a blood clot in her brain, a cerebral venous sinus thrombosis before she died. There had been 3 more new cases of TTS in the preceding week, for a total of 48. Also on 10 June, at 11:59 pm, Victoria's fourth lockdown ended, with some restrictions remaining: no visitors in the home; people must wear a mask both indoors and outdoors; travel for Melbourne residents limited to 25 km (16 mi) radius of home.

By mid-June COVID-19 digital vaccination certificates became available through Medicare linked myGov accounts, or the Express Plus Medicare smartphone app. Also in mid-June, Labrador sniffer dogs were deployed by Australian Border Force on a trial basis at Adelaide Airport as part of a feasibility study into using the dogs to detect people with COVID-19 infections. Previous trials were carried out at Sydney Airport in March.

From 16 June 2021, NSW residents aged over 50 were able to get an AstraZeneca vaccination from selected pharmacies. The NSW health department approved 1,250 pharmacies to administer the vaccine under strict regulations. It was also on 16 June 2021 that a case of the Delta variant of COVID-19 was confirmed in Sydney; in a Bondi limousine driver who transported international flight crews.

On 17 June, on the advice of ATAGI, Health Minister Greg Hunt said the federal government would only recommend the Oxford-AstraZeneca vaccine be administered to people aged 60 years and over. Everyone under 60 will be offered the Pfizer vaccine. Hunt stated that about 815,000 Australians between ages 50 and 59 had received a first dose of the AstraZeneca vaccine.

Bondi cluster

On 18 June in NSW, masks were again made mandatory on public transport in Greater Sydney from 4pm that day. A COVID-19 cluster in Sydney's Eastern Suburbs had grown to 4 cases. This cluster was later found to be of the delta variant of COVID-19.

On 19 June, there were 6 cases in the emerging Bondi cluster.

By 22 June the cluster in Bondi had increased by 10 to 22 cases, and 31 cases by 23 June. New movement restrictions were enacted from 4pm that day. People from the NSW LGAs of Bayside, Canada Bay, Inner West, Randwick, Waverley and Woollahra were not permitted to leave the Sydney metropolitan area, except for essential purposes. The cluster increased to 65 by 25 June, 80 by 26 June, 124 by 28 June, 160 cases by 30 June, and 175 by 1 July.

On 23 June, tighter social distancing restrictions were also enacted covering residents of Greater Sydney, Blue Mountains, Central Coast, Wollongong, and Shellharbour.

Also on 23 June, the Federal government released vaccine allocation projections and forecast that the Oxford-AstraZeneca vaccine would be in "little need" past October 2021 when all Australians over 60 years were expected to be fully vaccinated.

Owing to the growing Bondi cluster the other States and Territories reacted:

- Australian Capital Territory: from 4pm on 23 June, the ACT Government placed restrictions on recent travellers from Sydney, Bayside, Canada Bay, Inner West, Randwick, Waverley and Woollahra. Unless they have an approved exemption, non-ACT residents who have been in any of the listed LGAs in NSW will find the border, in effect, closed to them. ACT Health Minister, Rachel Stephen-Smith, advised against travel to the Greater Sydney area.
- Northern Territory: from 6pm (local) on 24 June, NT declared all of Greater Sydney a hotspot. Any person entering NT from Sydney will have to quarantine for 14 days.
- Queensland: from 1am on 24 June, all of Greater Sydney was declared a hotspot. Border entry will be refused to anyone who lives in, or has visited: Greater Sydney, the Blue Mountains, Central Coast, Wollongong or Shellharbour. Residents returning will be quarantined for 14 days. Everyone entering Queensland will have to complete a border declaration.
- South Australia: on 23 June, "immediately" reinstated a hard border with NSW. No one who has been in NSW in the past 14 days will be allowed entry to SA. A border buffer of 100 km is in place. Exemption are available for residents returning to SA, essential travellers, and special cases.
- Tasmania: from 4pm on 23 June, declared the City of Sydney, Bayside, Canada Bay, Inner West, Randwick, Waverley and Woollahra as high-risk. Entry will not be allowed to anyone who was in those areas, on or since, 11 June without approval from the Deputy State Controller.
- Victoria: from 11:59pm on 24 June, entry will be barred to non-Victorian residents who have been in Greater Sydney and Wollongong in the last 14 days as those areas were considered to be red zones. Victorians will have to get a red zone permit and quarantine at home for 14 days.
- Western Australia: from 11am on 23 June, a hard border with NSW was reinstated. Special exemptions are required for border entry, and 14 days quarantine is required.

On 24 June in Western Australia, the death of a 61-year-old woman at Royal Perth Hospital from immune thrombocytopenic purpura (ITP) wa reported, which was later linked by the TGA to her Astra-Zeneca vaccination.

As of 24 June in NSW, the Bondi cluster had grown to 36 cases. Restrictions in force in NSW as of 24 June were scheduled to remain so until 1 July at 12:01am. On 25 June in NSW, after 22 new cases of the delta variant brought infections linked to the Bondi cluster to 65 total, a lockdown was announced for four Sydney LGAs. The City of Sydney, Randwick, Waverley and Woollahra are the affected places. From 11:59pm on 25 June those who live there, or have worked there in the past 14 days, have to isolate at home until at least 11:59pm on 2 July (Friday). The usual 'essential reasons' for leaving home apply. Up to 1 million people may be affected. Current NSW restrictions like mandatory masks indoors and on public transport have been extended to the same time and date.

Also on 25 June, an alternate National NAIDOC Awards event due on 3 July 2021 at the Sydney Opera House, planned after the 2021 National NAIDOC Awards ceremony in Alice Springs (Mparntwe) was cancelled, was itself postponed. As Sydney went into a COVID lockdown on 23 June, rules for travellers returning to the Northern Territory meant that most people could not attend the Sydney event without a 14-day quarantine.

By 26 June, infections linked to the Bondi cluster rose to 80. Of these, 20 were also connected to a birthday party in Hoxton Park.

At 6:00pm on 26 June the lockdown area in NSW was extended to Greater Sydney, the Blue Mountains, Central Coast and Wollongong, until 11.59pm on 9 July. Social distancing restrictions for the rest of NSW were also tightened, only 5 visitors allowed in homes (includes children), masks became mandatory in indoor non-residential settings, the 4-square-metre space rule applies again for indoor or outdoor settings, drinking while standing at indoor venues not permitted, dancing not permitted at indoor hospitality venues and nightclubs, dancing is allowed at weddings for the wedding party (20 people maximum), dance and gym classes - 20 people maximum per class - masks mandatory. People in NSW who had been in the Greater Sydney region (including Blue Mountains, Central Coast, Wollongong) on, or after, 21 June must adhere to stay-at-home orders for 14 days after they left. Weddings were permitted on 26 – 27 June, but then banned until 9 July. The later inclusion in the lockdown of Shellharbour, which has had no local cases of COVID-19, was questioned by local residents and the Mayor Marianne Saliba. According to Saliba there has been no adequate explanation given by the NSW Government for the lockdown of Shelharbour.

On 26 June in the Northern Territory, The Granites gold mine went into lockdown after a worker tested positive for COVID-19. The mine is 540 km (340 mi) north-west of Alice Springs. About 750 FIFO (fly-in/fly-out) workers onsite were affected, while 900 who left the site recently had to go into isolation.

Also on 26 June, New Zealand paused trans-Tasman travel with Australia from 8:30pm (AEST), until 10pm (AEST) on 29 June, due to multiple outbreaks across Australia of the delta variant.

On 27 June, at 1pm, Darwin went into a 'snap' lockdown, for at least 48 hours, after more COVID-19 cases were confirmed that were linked to the Granites gold mine case. They were believed to be of the delta COVID-19 variant. The affected areas are the Darwin, Palmerston and Litchfield council areas. During the lockdown people may only leave their homes for "essential" reasons: essential work, medical treatment, essential goods and services, exercise, give care to people who cannot to support themselves. Masks are mandatory outside the home. The next day the lockdown was extended to 2 July.

Also on 27 June, at mid-day in Western Australia restrictions were tightened for at least 3 days in the Perth and Peel regions after a woman tested positive 2 weeks after she visited a known COVID-19 hotspot in Sydney. Measures included, masks became mandatory on public transport and indoors, private gatherings at home-restricted to 30 people. 14 days quarantine was required for any border entry from the ACT, NT or Queensland.

=== 28 June ===
By 28 June in New South Wales, the outbreak in Sydney had increased to 130 cases, 124 of them linked to the cluster in Bondi.

On 28 June in the Northern Territory, as The Granites mine COVID cluster there had grown to 7 cases, the lockdown in Darwin was extended by 72 hours to 1pm on 2 July. The same day, the Northern Territory's 1 July celebrations for Territory Day, were postponed due to the outbreak at The Granites goldmine and the resulting lockdown till 2 July in Greater Darwin.

On 28 June, Queensland recorded 3 new COVID-19 cases overnight. 2 locally acquired, one from overseas. A miner had the delta variant after returning to Queensland from the Northern Territory. As a result, from 10pm on 29 June, masks were mandatory in the local government areas of: Brisbane, Ipswich, Logan, Lockyer Valley, Moreton Bay, Noosa, Redland, Scenic Rim Region, Somerset and the Sunshine Coast Region. In addition, masks were required to be worn in Queensland workplaces when another person was present, dancing was again banned and no more than 30 people allowed inside homes. On 29 June the lockdown was greatly expanded.

On 28 June, in South Australia from midnight, the state pre-emptively re-introduced a number of restrictions for at least 7 days including: masks were mandatory in high-risk settings such as aged care facilities, hospitals and similar, and in indoor entertainment venues. Masks were not required, but highly recommended on public transport.

On 28 June, at midnight in Western Australia, a 4-day lockdown was declared in the Perth and Peel regions after a third case of the delta variant was detected. Residents were required to stay home except for essential work, shopping, an hour of daily exercise, or medical appointments. Community sport was not permitted. Schools and day care centres remained open. Restaurants, bars, hotels and similar venues remained open for takeaway food only.

=== 29 June ===
On 29 June in Queensland from 6pm, the existing lockdown in Brisbane was expanded to new areas. All of South East Queensland plus Townsville city, Magnetic Island and Palm Island went into lockdown for 3 days, till 6pm on 2 July. This was because a casual clerical worker from Prince Charles Hospital in Brisbane became infected and travelled from Sandgate in Brisbane to Magnetic Island and Townsville.

With lockdowns in Sydney, Darwin, Perth and Brisbane, on 29 June more than 12 million of Australia's population was in lockdown.

By 30 June, the 'Bondi cluster' of delta variant COVID-19 reached 160 cases, which began on 19 June 2021, became Sydney's largest cluster to this date. The previous high was 151 in the 'Northern Beaches' or 'Avalon cluster', in December 2020–January 2021. The next largest was the 116 cases of the Wetherill Park cluster of July–August 2020. Sydney has had 18 clusters as of this date.

== See also ==
- Chart of COVID-19 cases in Australia (template)
- COVID-19 clusters in Australia
- COVID-19 pandemic in Australia
- COVID-19 pandemic in Australia (timeline)
- COVID-19 vaccination in Australia
- Chart of COVID-19 cases in Australia (template)
- COVID-19 pandemic by country
- COVID-19 pandemic in Oceania
- Biosecurity in Australia
- National Cabinet of Australia
- National COVID-19 Coordination Commission
- National Security Committee (Australia)
- Coronavirus Australia
- Xenophobia and racism related to the COVID-19 pandemic#Australia
