= Chief medical officer =

Corporate or government medical official and advisor

Chief medical officer (CMO) is the title used in many countries for the senior government official designated head of medical services, sometimes at the national level. The post is held by a physician who serves to advise and lead a team of medical experts on matters of public health importance.

The post of chief medical officer dates back to Victorian times. The equivalent title may go under different names across countries, for example, the Surgeon General in the United States and the Chief Public Health Officer in Canada.

By extension, chief medical officer is also used as a job title, for the physician who is the professional lead of all physicians at a hospital.

== By country ==
=== Australia ===
The Chief Medical Officer is the principal health advisor to the Australian government. The position is a medical appointment, reporting to the Departmental secretary for the Department of Health and Aged Care. The position is responsible for the Office of Health Protection which itself has responsibility for biosecurity, immunisation and disease surveillance. The position is also responsible for "maintaining high-quality relationships between the department, the medical profession, medical colleges, universities and other key stakeholders". Other responsibilities of the position vary according to the skills and background of the officeholder. The position was created in November 1982 because the newly appointed Director-General of Health was not a doctor. The position is an advisory in nature and does not have executive or operational authority.

As of 22 October 2024, the Chief Medical Officer is Tony Lawler, who succeeded Paul Kelly.

As of 23 January 2021, the joint Deputy Chief Medical Officers were Nick Coatsworth, Ruth Vine and Michael Kidd. In May 2020, psychiatrist Ruth Vine was appointed the first Deputy Chief Medical Officer for Mental Health.

Previous officers include John Horvath in 2003, Jim Bishop in 2009, and Chris Baggoley from August 2011 until 2016. The role has recently been focused on immigration and related health issues, as well as the ongoing COVID-19 pandemic. The position is head of the Australian Health Protection Principal Committee and in that role an adviser to the National Cabinet of Australia, created in response to the pandemic.

In June 2024, former Deputy Chief Medical Officer Nick Coatsworth admitted he had not had a COVID vaccine for two years and stated he would not be getting any more vaccinations for the virus.

=== Canada ===
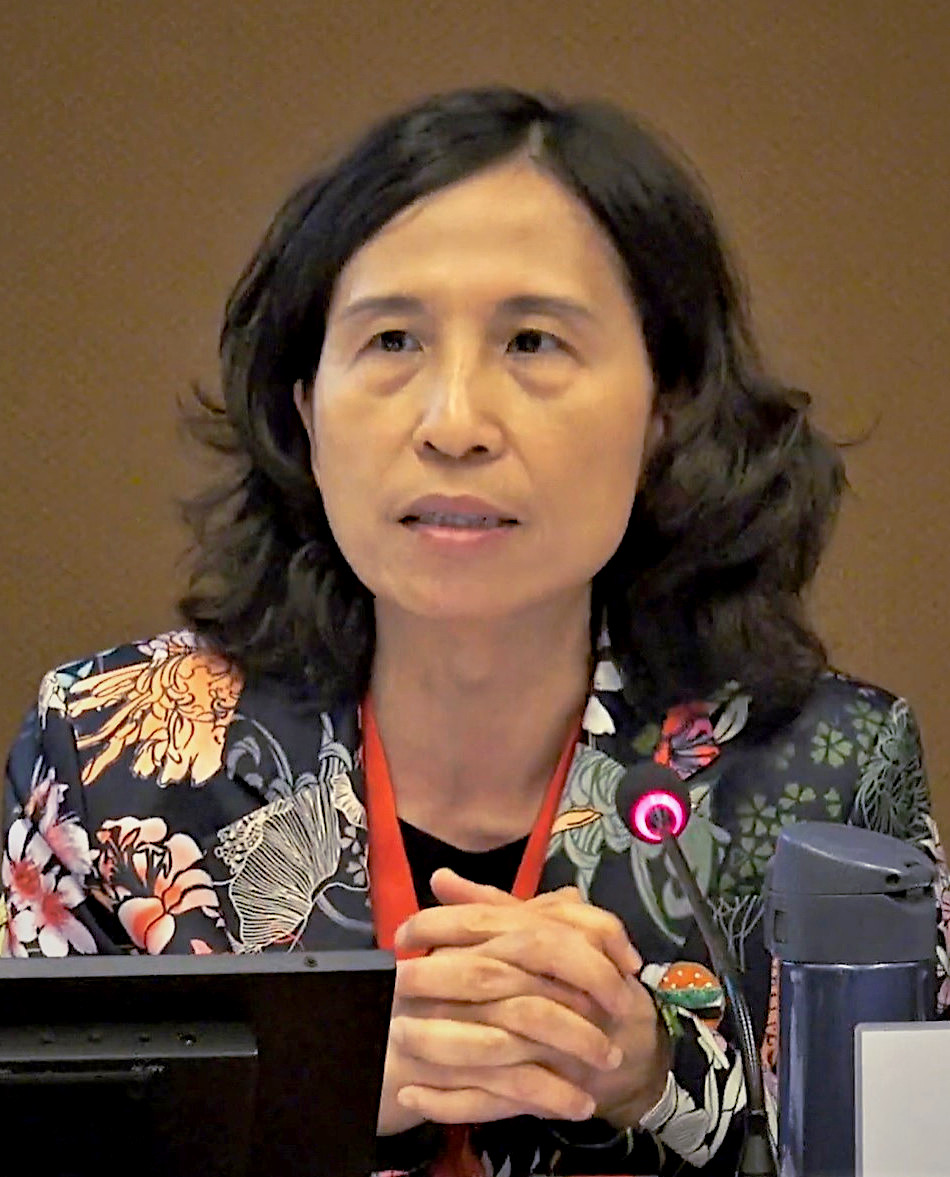

The chief public health officer of Canada (CPHO; French: administratrice en chef de la santé publique; ACSP) (Note: When the position is held by a male, the French title is administrateur en chef de la santé publique.) is the lead health professional and primary spokesperson on public health related matters for the Government of Canada. The chief public health officer provides advice to the minister of health and the president of the Public Health Agency of Canada (PHAC), works in collaboration with the agency president in the agency's leadership and management, and works with other departments and levels of government on public health matters. PHAC, along with the CPHO post was established in 2004 amidst the SARS crisis.

The third and current chief public health officer of Canada is Theresa Tam, who was appointed in June 2017.

=== Ireland ===
The Chief Medical Officer (CMO) (Irish: an Príomh-Dhochtúir Oifigiúil) for Ireland is the most senior government advisor on health-related matters. It is a government post as the lead medical expert in the Department of Health.

The key responsibilities of the CMO include providing expert medical evidence, especially in public health matters, as well as leading on patient safety issues, emergency planning and other areas.

=== United Kingdom ===
In the United Kingdom, a chief medical officer (CMO) is the most senior government advisor on matter relating to health. There are four chief medical officers in the United Kingdom who are appointed to advise their respective governments:

- His Majesty's Government (CMO for England and medical advisor to the United Kingdom government)
- Scottish Government
- Welsh Government
- Northern Ireland Executive

Each CMO is assisted by one or more deputy chief medical officers, and complemented by a chief nursing officer.

The chief medical officer is a qualified medical doctor whose medical speciality traditionally was public health medicine, and whose work focused on the health of communities rather than health of individuals. More recently, some appointees have been senior clinicians without training in public health medicine. In the UK, the CMO is one of the chief professional officers who advise the government in their respective health and social care disciplines. The CMO has independent statutory authority, first established in the 19th century, to issue reports without requiring government approval.

=== United States ===
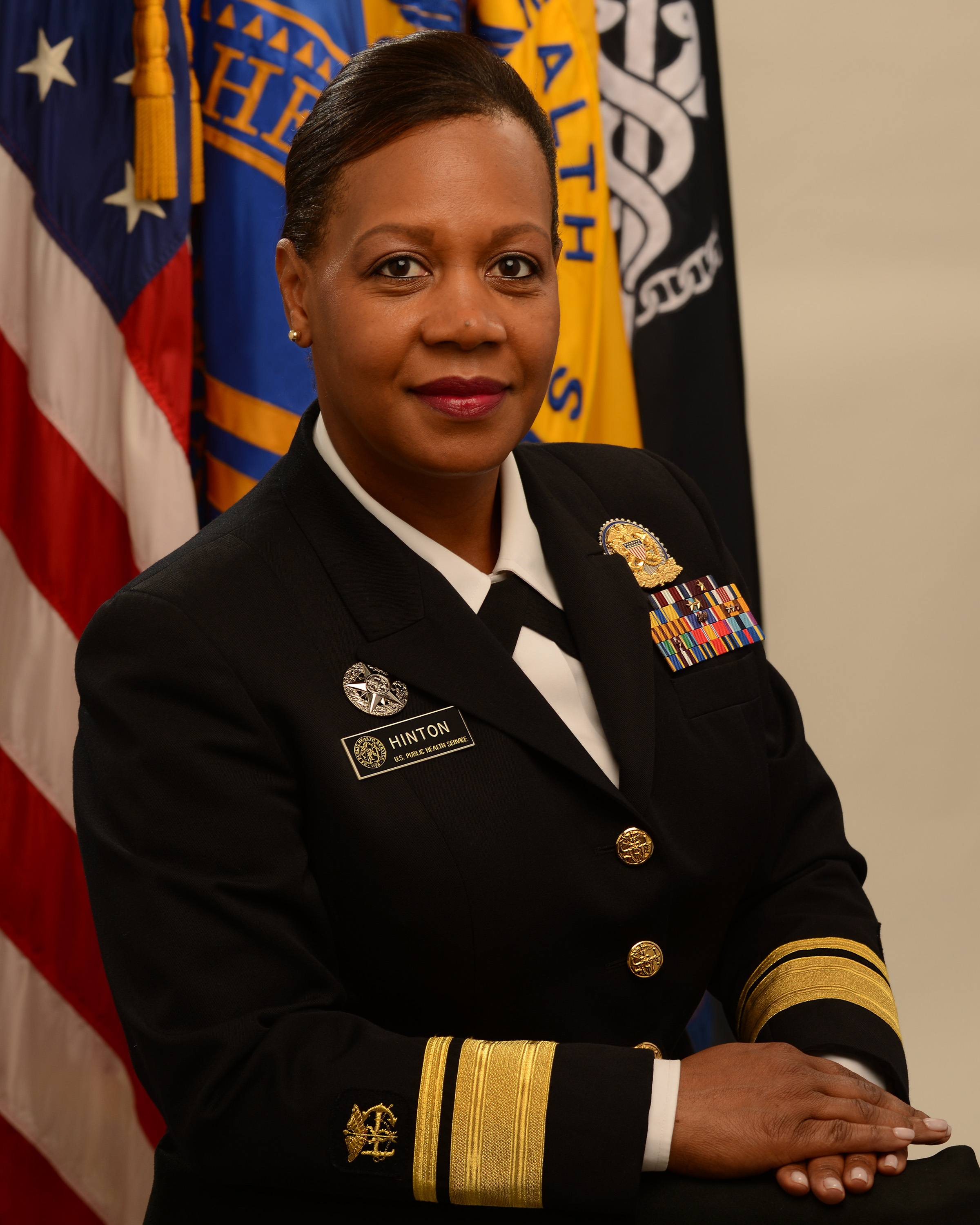

The surgeon general of the United States is the operational head of the United States Public Health Service Commissioned Corps (PHSCC) and thus the leading spokesperson on matters of public health in the federal government of the United States. The surgeon general's office and staff are known as the Office of the Surgeon General (OSG), which is housed within the Office of the Assistant Secretary for Health.

The U.S. surgeon general is nominated by the president of the United States and confirmed by the Senate. The surgeon general must be appointed from individuals who are members of the regular corps of the U.S. Public Health Service and have specialized training or significant experience in public health programs. However, there is no time requirement for membership in the Public Health Service before holding the office of the Surgeon General, and nominees traditionally were appointed as members of the Public Health Service and as surgeon general at the same time. The surgeon general serves a four-year term of office and, depending on whether the current assistant secretary for health is a commissioned corps officer, is either the senior or next-most senior uniformed officer of the commissioned corps, holding the rank of vice admiral.
