= Responses to the COVID-19 pandemic in December 2020 =

Aspect of viral disease pandemic

This article documents the chronology of the response to the COVID-19 pandemic in December 2020, which originated in Wuhan, China in December 2019. Some developments may become known or fully understood only in retrospect. Reporting on this pandemic began in December 2019.

== Reactions and measures in Africa ==
=== 18 December ===
- South African health authorities have reported the detection of a new COVID-19 variant known as the 501Y.V2 variant in the provinces of Eastern Cape, Western Cape, and KwaZulu-Natal. This variant is similar to a British strain detected that same month, and both are considered to be more infectious than earlier strains.

== Reactions and measures in the Americas ==
=== 3 December ===
- President-elect of the United States Joe Biden has announced that he would ask Americans to commit to 100 days of wearing masks as one of his first acts as president.

=== 10 December ===
- Canada's health regulator Health Canada approves the use of Pfizer–BioNTech's COVID-19 vaccine, stating that the vaccine met its "stringent safety, efficacy and quality requirements". The Canadian Government has purchased 20 million doses of the vaccine, with Canadian Prime Minister Justin Trudeau announcing that the first batch of 249,000 are scheduled to arrive that month.

=== 11 December ===
- The United States Food and Drug Administration's advisor group approves the use of Pfizer–BioNTech's COVID-19 vaccine.

=== 19 December ===
- United States Vice-President Mike Pence, his wife Karen Pence, and Surgeon General Jerome Adams receive Pfizer–BioNTech's COVID-19 vaccine in an effort to boost public confidence in the safety and effectiveness of the new vaccine.

== Reactions and measures in the Eastern Mediterranean ==
=== 5 December ===
- Bahrain's National Health Regulatory Authority has approved the emergency use of the Pfizer/BioNTech COVID-19 vaccine.

== Reactions and measures in Europe ==
=== 2 December ===
- The United Kingdom becomes the first country to approve the Pfizer/BioNTech vaccine for mass immunisation.

=== 8 December ===
- 90 year old British woman Margaret Keenan becomes the first person to receive the Pfizer/BioNTech vaccine. 70 hospitals in the United Kingdom are preparing to deliver the vaccine this week.

=== 14 December ===
- German Chancellor Angela Merkel announces that Germany will enter into a "hard lockdown" during the Christmas period between 16 December 2020 and 10 January 2021 following a wave of infections and deaths. Under these new restrictions, a maximum of five people from no more than two households will be allowed to gather in homes. Between 24 and 26 December, this measure will be relaxed to allow one household to invite a maximum of four close family members from other households.

=== 16 December ===
- The European Parliament gave its consent to the next Multiannual Financial Framework 2021-2027 boosting health-programmes. It will keep an eye on how Next Generation EU funds are spent to better protect citizens from the COVID-19 pandemic.

=== 20 December ===
- British Prime Minister Boris Johnson has cancelled the relaxation of COVID-19 rules for England, Scotland and Wales during the Christmas holiday period and reintroduced Tier Four restrictions to London and parts of south-eastern England in response to rising cases that month.

=== 21 December ===
- Several European Union countries including Ireland, Germany, France, Italy, Belgium, and the Netherlands have reimposed travel bans and restrictions on the United Kingdom in response to the emergence of a "more-infectious" and "out of control" COVID-19 variant. Later that day, it was reported that 40 countries including several European Union member states, India, Russia, Jordan, Hong Kong, Israel, and Canada have placed travel bans on the United Kingdom.

== Reactions and measures in South and Southeast Asia ==
=== 5 December ===
- Malaysian Senior Minister Ismail Sabri Yaakob has confirmed that Malaysia would allow unrestricted interstate travel across states and districts from 7 December with the exception of areas under an Enhanced Movement Control Order (EMCO), which will still require a police permit.

=== 7 December ===
- The Malaysian National Security Council has lifted the cap on the number of diners at restaurants in areas under the Conditional Movement Control Order including Kuala Lumpur.

=== 13 December ===
- Malaysian Director General of Health Noor Hisham Abdullah has announced that the quarantine period will be reduced from two weeks to 10 days for all travellers and close contacts of COVID-19 positive patients.

=== 19 December ===
- Malaysian Health Minister Dr Adham Baba confirmed that the Malaysian Government would be signing an agreement with British pharmaceutical company AstraZeneca to purchase COVID-19 vaccines on 21 December.

=== 23 December ===
- The Malaysian Health Ministry confirmed that it had identified a new COVID-19 strain dubbed the "A701B" strain, which is similar to a strain found in South Africa, Australia, and the Netherlands.

=== 24 December ===
- Malaysian Senior Minister Ismail Sabri Yaakob confirmed that the National Security Council would enforce the compulsory screening of all foreign workers from 1 January 2021 so that action can be taken against employers who refuse to have their workers tested.

== Reactions and measures in the Western Pacific ==
=== 11 December ===
- Premier of Queensland Annastacia Palaszczuk has announced that the state of Queensland will open its borders to New Zealand from 1 am the following day (12 December), exempting travelers from New Zealand from quarantine restrictions.

=== 12 December ===
- New Zealand Prime Minister Jacinda Ardern and Cook Islands Prime Minister Mark Brown announce that a two-way quarantine-free travel bubble between New Zealand and the Cook Islands will be established next year.

=== 14 December ===
- New Zealand prime minister Jacinda Ardern has announced that the New Zealand Cabinet plans to establish a quarantine free travel bubble with Australia in the first quarter of 2021. Australian Health Minister Greg Hunt welcomed the move, describing it as the "first step" in normalising international travel.

=== 17 December ===
- New Zealand prime minister Jacinda Ardern announced that the New Zealand Government had purchased two types of vaccines from AstraZeneca and Novavax for New Zealand, the Cook Islands, Niue, Tokelau and its Pacific partners Samoa, Tonga, and Tuvalu.

=== 18 December ===
- Australia's Chief Medical Officer Paul Kelly has designated Sydney's Northern Beaches region a national COVID-19 hotspot following an outbreak resulting in 28 community transmissions.
- Queensland health authorities have imposed new border restrictions including a mandatory two-week quarantine period on anyone entering the state who had visited Sydney's Northern Beaches region.

=== 19 December ===
- Western Australia has reinstated its hard border with New South Wales in response to an outbreak in Sydney's Northern Beaches region, no longer permitting travel from NSW without an exemption.

=== 20 December ===
- Premier of New South Wales Gladys Berejiklian has imposed social gathering restrictions across Greater Sydney, the Blue Mountains, and the Central Coast areas including caps limit on social gatherings and restrictions on dancing and singing.
- New Zealand Immigration Minister Kris Faafoi announces a six-month extension for employer-assisted work and working holiday visa holders along with their partners and children in order to address the country's labour shortage. In addition, the New Zealand Government will suspend a 12-month stand-down period for low-paid Essential Skills visa holders working in the country for three years until January 2022.

== See also ==
- Timeline of the COVID-19 pandemic
