= Brendan Murphy (doctor) =

Secretary of the Department of Health and Aged Care

Professor Brendan Murphy AC
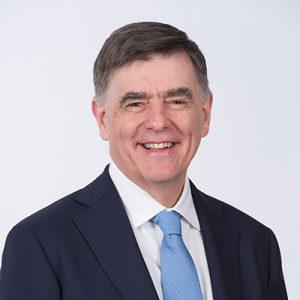

Chief Medical Officer
- In office 4 October 2016 – 26 June 2020
- Preceded by: Chris Baggoley
- Succeeded by: Paul Kelly

Secretary of the Department of Health
- In office 13 July 2020 – 6 July 2023
- Preceded by: Glenys Beauchamp
- Succeeded by: Blair Comley

Personal details
- Born: Brendan Murphy; 1955 (age 70–71) Melbourne, Victoria
- Spouse: Sally Walker (m. 1979)
- Education: Preshil; Melbourne Grammar School; Trinity College, Melbourne
- Occupation: Public servant
- Profession: Nephrologist

Brendan Murphy AC (born 1955) is an Australian public servant, health executive and nephrologist who served as the Chief Medical Officer (CMO) of Australia from 4 October 2016 before serving as the Secretary of the Department of Health from 13 July 2020 until his retirement on 6 July 2023.

== Biography ==
Murphy was born in 1955 and educated at Preshil, Melbourne Grammar School and Trinity College within the University of Melbourne. He married lawyer and university administrator Sally Walker in 1979 and has two sons.

Murphy was a nephrologist by profession and was formerly president of the Australian and New Zealand Society of Nephrology; CMO and director of nephrology at St Vincent's Health; CEO of Austin Health; and a board member of Health Workforce Australia, the Florey Institute of Neuroscience and Mental Health, the Olivia Newton-John Cancer Research Institute, and the Victorian Comprehensive Cancer Centre. Murphy was the first medical doctor to be appointed the public servant position of Secretary of the Department of Health in its current incarnation, and since Dr Gwynne Howells, who was Secretary to the former Department of Health until 1982. Murphy retired as Secretary on 6 July 2023.

== Chief Medical Officer ==
Murphy was appointed CMO of Australia on 4 October 2016, when he replaced Chris Baggoley. He became "the public face of Australia's fight against COVID-19" during the COVID-19 pandemic in Australia, giving regular press conferences with the Prime Minister, Scott Morrison, and Health Minister Greg Hunt.

Murphy was also head of the Australian Health Protection Principal Committee and in that role an adviser to the National Cabinet of Australia created to respond to the pandemic.

He vacated the role of CMO on 29 June 2020, and became the Secretary of the Department of Health on 13 July 2020, an appointment initially announced in January 2020, but delayed due to his central role in the response to the Coronavirus pandemic. His deputy, Paul Kelly, is acting the role of CMO until a new appointment is made.

== Recognition ==
On 2 November 2020 Murphy was named Australian Capital Territory's Australian of the Year.

In June 2022, Murphy was appointed Companion of the Order of Australia in the 2022 Queen's Birthday Honours for "eminent service to medical administration and community health, particularly as Chief Medical Officer, and to nephrology, to research and innovation, and to professional organisations".

Government offices
Preceded by Chris Baggoley	Chief Medical Officer; 2016–2020	Succeeded by Paul Kelly
