= National E-Conveyancing Development Ltd =

The National E-Conveyancing Development Ltd (NECDL) was a government-owned organisation set up by Australian governments. It was established by and majority owned by the Victorian, New South Wales, Queensland and WA state governments.

== History ==
In July 2008, an agreement reached at a COAG meeting was that work should commence on creating a national single electronic system for settling property sales and transactions in Australia. At the time, processing each settlement of real property transactions through the registration of a transfer of title on torrens titles was paper-based by each State and Territory Government's Land and Title Registrar.

The NECDL was then established in 2010 in order to coordinate this national approach to e-conveyancing.

In 2011 all six States and the Northern Territory signed the Electronic Conveyancing National Law Agreement, an Intergovernmental Agreement for developing, implementing and managing the regulatory framework for national e-conveyancing.

=== Rebranding ===
The name was changed to Property Exchange Australia Ltd (PEXA) in 2014.

=== Privatisation ===
The organisation was privatised through a trade sale to private investors made up of Link Group, the Commonwealth Bank of Australia and Morgan Stanley Infrastructure Inc in January 2019 for A$1.9 billion. The company is now listed on the ASX as PEXA Group Ltd.
