= Lenore Harney =

First female doctor from St. Kitts & Nevis

- Born: Jean Lenore Harney; April 14, 1925; Saint Christopher, Nevis and Anguilla
- Died: June 24, 2020 (aged 95)
- Occupation: Physician
- Known for: First female doctor from St Kitts and Nevis

Lenore Harney (April 14, 1925 — June 24, 2020) was the first female doctor and pilot from Saint Kitts and Nevis.

== Early life and education ==
Harney was born on April 14, 1925 to a businessman, John Leonard Harney, and his wife Mae. She was the youngest of 5 children, all girls. Harney was born and raised on Saint Kitts.

Harney attended the St. Kitts Girls High School (today, Basseterre High School). In 1942, she won the Leeward Islands Scholarship, becoming the first woman from St. Kitts and Nevis to win the prestigious award, and allowing her the opportunity to go to university. Harney went on to study medicine at Liverpool University and became the first female doctor from her home country.

== Medical career ==
Upon returning to Saint Kitts from the University of Liverpool, Harney worked for several years at the Cunningham Hospital. She later went on to study at Harvard University, where she focused on public health.

From 1960 to 1969, Harney worked in Barbados as the Senior Medical Officer. While living in Barbados, she earned her pilot's license, and became the first female pilot from St. Kitts and Nevis. In 1969, she began to work as a representative of various Caribbean countries for larger organizations like the Pan American Health Organization and the World Health Organization. In 1974, she returned to Barbados as the Chief Medical Officer.

In 1994, Harney received an award from the Caribbean Public Health Association.

== Personal life ==
Harney enjoyed learning languages. In addition to English, she knew Spanish and French, and she began taking Mandarin classes from the Taiwanese Embassy of St. Kitts while in her 80s. She married Sydney Blake when they were both in their 80s and retired.

Harney has published two books. The first book, That I May Remember: The History of the St. Kitts-Nevis Girls High School, was published on her high school's 75th anniversary and commemorates its history.

- That I May Remember: The History of the St. Kitts-Nevis Girls High School
- Shake, Rattle and Roll: The Story Of The Barbados Railway

Harney passed away on June 24, 2020 at the age of 95. It was only some months after her elder sister, Mavis, passed away on December 12, 2019.
