= John Horvath =

John Horvath may refer to:

- John Horvath (doctor), Chief Medical Officer of Australia between 2003 and 2009
- John Horvath (mathematician), Hungarian-American mathematician noted for his contributions to analysis
