= Jim Bishop (disambiguation) =

Jim Bishop (1907–1987) was an American journalist and author. Other people with the name include:

- Jim Bishop (doctor), Chief Medical Officer of Australia (2009–2011)
- Jim Bishop (bishop) (1908–1994), Suffragan Bishop of Malmesbury (1962–1973)
- Jim Bishop (baseball) (1898–1973), Major League Baseball pitcher
- Jim Bishop (1944–2024), constructor of Bishop Castle in Colorado
