= Anthony Irvine Adams =

Australian Chief Medical Officer

Professor Tony Adams AM

Chief Medical Officer
- In office 1988–1997
- Preceded by: David de Souza
- Succeeded by: Judith Whitworth

Personal details
- Born: Anthony Irvine Adams; 25 February 1936
- Died: 7 August 2025 (aged 89)
- Education: University of Adelaide; Harvard School of Public Health
- Profession: Medical doctor

Anthony Irvine Adams AM (25 February 1936 – 7 August 2025) was an Australian public health physician. He was the Australian Chief Medical Officer between 1988 and 1997.

== Early life ==
Anthony Adams studied medicine at the University of Adelaide graduating in 1959. He undertook postgraduate studies at Harvard School of Public Health obtaining a Master of Public Health (MPH) degree in 1961.

While in the USA in 1962 he attended the annual meeting of the American Public Health Association in Miami and was so inspired that he resolved to start a Public Health Association in Australia. He worked at the School of Public Health in Sydney as senior lecturer in 1964.

== Career ==
In Australia at that time there was a New South Wales Public Health Association and a Western Australia Public Health Association plus the Queensland Society for Health but no national body. There was also no academic organisation to coordinate public health research in the country.

In 1968, he convened a meeting to establish the Australian (later Australian and New Zealand Society) for Research in Community Health and finally formed the Australian Public Health Association.

In 1969, he was secretary of both organisations. He made sure that Australia joined the World Federation of Public Health Associations. He was Chief Health Officer in NSW, and Chief Medical Officer for Australia (1988–1997) and then Professor of Public Health at the Australian National University.

He led the Australian delegation to the World Health Assembly and the Western Pacific World Health Organization meetings for many years and in 2010 was still Chair of the Global Commission for the Certification of the Eradication of Poliomyelitis - the largest public health program in history.

He was a Fellow of the Australasian Faculty of Public Health Medicine, Fellow of the Royal Australasian College of Physicians, a Fellow of the Royal Australasian College of Medical Administrators, a Fellow of the Public Health Association of Australia and a Fellow of the American Public Health Association.

In 2001, he retired to Avoca Beach, New South Wales, but was still involved in local public health issues such as getting the benefits of fluoridated water to the last remaining areas in the state.

== Honours ==
He was made a Member of the Order of Australia in the 1998 Queen's Birthday Honours for "service to the community in the field of epidemiology and to the public health, particularly through public health policy development and program delivery".

In 2001, he was awarded the Harvard School of Public Health Alumni Award of Merit for a "distinguished service in public health practice".

In 2020, he received the Sidney Sax Public Health Medal from the Public Health Association of Australia for his notable contribution to the protection and promotion of public health.

== Death ==
He died on 7 August 2025.

Government offices
Preceded by David de Souza	Chief Medical Officer; 1988–1997	Succeeded by Judith Whitworth
