= Sally Walker (academic) =

Australian university administrator and lawyer

Professor Sally Walker AM

5th Vice-Chancellor of Deakin University
- In office January 2003 – July 2010
- Preceded by: Geoff Wilson
- Succeeded by: Jane den Hollander

Personal details
- Profession: Lawyer and administrator

Academic background
- Education: University of Melbourne

Academic work
- Discipline: Law
- Institutions: University of Melbourne; Deakin University

Sally Ann Walker AM is an Australian university administrator and lawyer. She served as the fifth Vice-Chancellor and President of Deakin University (2003–2010) and was the first woman to be appointed to the position.

== Early life and education ==
She studied at Warrnambool College and then received a scholarship to attend Melbourne Girls' Grammar School and subsequently earned a place in the Law School of The University of Melbourne, from which she graduated with a Bachelor of Laws degree with First Class Honours. In her graduating class, she was placed first and was awarded the Supreme Court Prize, the Anna Brennan Memorial Prize and the inaugural Joan Rosanove Memorial Prize. She later obtained a Master of Laws degree from the same institution.

== Law career ==
In 1978, she became an Associate to Justice Sir Keith Aickin of the High Court of Australia. The following year, she became an Associate Partner with Gillotts Solicitors (now part of Minter Ellison) in Melbourne. In April 1993, she became First Academic Secretary of the Victorian Attorney-General's Law Reform Advisory Council.

== Academic career ==
In 1980, she joined University of Melbourne and in 1993 became Hearn Professor of Law and was subsequently appointed to the positions of: President of the Academic Board, Pro-Vice Chancellor, and, until 2003, Senior Deputy Vice-Chancellor. In 2003, she was appointed as Vice-Chancellor and President of Deakin University, positions she held until July 2010.

In 2010, Deakin University conferred upon her an honorary degree of Doctor of Laws for her distinguished contribution to Deakin University, to legal education and scholarship and to higher education in general. She is a Professor Emeritus of both Deakin University and the University of Melbourne. In the 2011 Queen's Birthday Honours list, she was made a Member of the Order of Australia. She was inducted into the Victorian Honour Roll of Women in 2014.

== Personal life ==
Walker married doctor and former Chief Medical Officer of Australia Brendan Murphy in 1979 and has two sons.
