= National COVID-19 Commission Advisory Board =

COVID-19 economic advisory board of the Australian Government

Board overview
- Formed: 25 March 2020
- Dissolved: 3 May 2021
- Jurisdiction: Australian Government
- Board executive: Nev Power, Chairman
- Parent department: Department of the Prime Minister and Cabinet
- Website: pmc.gov.au/ncc

The National COVID-19 Commission Advisory Board (NCC) was the Australian Government strategic advisory board for the national economic recovery to the COVID-19 pandemic. Originally formed as the National COVID-19 Coordination Commission on 25 March 2020, Prime Minister Scott Morrison described the body as responsible for advising the government on public–private partnerships and coordination to mitigate the social and economic impacts of the pandemic in Australia. On 22 July 2020, the commission was renamed the National COVID-19 Commission Advisory Board to better reflect the advisory, not executive, nature of the body.

== Executive Board membership ==
Prime Minister Scott Morrison announced that membership of the Executive Board of the National COVID-19 Coordination Commission would consist of leaders from the private and public sectors.

The roles and membership were changed on 22 July 2020, with the commission becoming an advisory board. Entering into advisory roles were: Jane Halton, Paul Little, Catherine Tanna, David Thodey, Laura Berry, Samantha Hogg, Su McCluskey, Bao Hoang, Mike Hirst and Paul Howes. In addition, the Secretary of the Department of the Prime Minister and Cabinet Philip Gaetjens, and Secretary of the Department of Home Affairs Mike Pezzullo, assisted the board.

Position	Office holder	Background
Chair	Nev Power	Former CEO of Fortescue
Deputy Chair	David Thodey	Chair of the CSIRO and former CEO of Telstra
Commissioner	Jane Halton	Former Secretary of the Department of Finance and the Department of Health, Chair of the Coalition for Epidemic Preparedness Innovations
Commissioner	Paul Little	Former Managing Director of Toll Group
Commissioner	Catherine Tanna	Managing Director of EnergyAustralia
Commissioner	Philip Gaetjens	Secretary of the Department of the Prime Minister and Cabinet
Commissioner	Mike Pezzullo	Secretary of the Department of Home Affairs

Greg Combet was an inaugural commissioner for the National COVID-19 Coordination Commission but departed the board in July 2020.

== Secretariat ==
The Department of the Prime Minister and Cabinet provided secretariat support functions for the NCC.

== See also ==
- Australian Health Protection Principal Committee
- Council of Australian Governments
- National Cabinet
