= Nev Power =

Australian businessman and mechanical engineer

- Born: Neville Power; 1958 (age 67–68)
- Education: Darling Downs Institute of Advanced Education; University of Queensland
- Occupations: Mining engineer; Company executive; Corporate director
- Known for: CEO of Fortescue; Chairman of National COVID-19 Commission Advisory Board

Neville Power (born 1958) is an Australian corporate director and former company executive. He has a background as a mining engineer and was Chief Executive Officer of Fortescue from 2011 to 2018. He was the chair of the National COVID-19 Commission Advisory Board, which was established in March 2020 during the COVID-19 pandemic.

== Early life ==
Power was born in 1958. He grew up on Bushy Park, a cattle station near Duchess, Queensland. He was initially home-schooled before attending high school in Mount Isa.

Power left school at the age of 15 and began an apprenticeship as a fitter and turner at Mount Isa Mines. He later completed an engineering degree at the Darling Downs Institute of Advanced Education and an Master of Business Administration at the University of Queensland.

== Career ==
=== Private sector ===
Power worked for Mount Isa Mines for 23 years, eventually becoming head of its gold division and then general manager of its subsidiary Oaky Creek Coal. He later moved to Melbourne to work for Smorgon Steel, spending 12 years with the company. He was appointed chief executive (reinforcing and steel products) in 2001. He later moved to Brisbane to join Thiess, where he championed an indigenous employment program and rose to become CEO of the Australian operations.

Power succeeded company founder Andrew Forrest as CEO of Fortescue (in July 2011, after a period as Chief Operating Officer. According to the Australian Financial Review, he "steered the company through a near death experience in 2012, when a heavy debt burden pushed it perilously close to the brink, and oversaw a massive operational expansion which cemented its place as the world's fourth-largest iron ore producer". He was strongly opposed to the proposed Minerals Resource Rent Tax.

Power retired from Fortescue in 2018. He has since taken up an appointment as chair of Perth Airport. In September 2019 he joined the board of Strike Energy, an oil and gas exploration firm, of which he is a major shareholder.

=== Public sector ===
Power is the chair of the Western Australian Museum.

In March 2020, Prime Minister Scott Morrison nominated Power to chair the National COVID-19 Commission Advisory Board, created in response to the COVID-19 pandemic. This board was wound down in late 2021.

== Personal life ==
Power holds helicopter and fixed-wing pilot's licences.

On 8 October 2021, Power and his son, Nicholas Power, illegally breached Western Australian border entry laws by flying a helicopter from their family property near Mount Isa to Exmouth, and then to Perth the next day. They pleaded guilty and are due to be sentenced on 23 March 2022. As a consequence, Power has resigned as chair of both Perth Airport and the Royal Flying Doctor Service. In seeking a non-prison sentence, Power's lawyer said it was an “'out-of-character aberration' and a 'very bad lack of judgment', adding Mr Power was 'dripping with remorse'. It was also stated that Power experienced “cognitive distortions” and was having marital difficulties.
