= Diana Horvath =

Australian doctor and medical administrator

Professor Diana Horvath AO
- Education: University of Sydney
- Occupations: Medical doctor, administrator
- Spouse: John Horvath AO

Diana Glen Horvath AO (born 1944) is an Australian medical doctor, researcher and administrator and the first female chair of the National Health and Medical Research Council.

== Early life and education ==
Horvath graduated from Redlands, Cremorne and the University of Sydney with a Bachelor of Medicine, Bachelor of Surgery in 1968. She later completed a Masters of Health Planning from the University of New South Wales.

== Career ==
Horvath served as a junior medical officer for three years before emigrating with her husband John to work at Johns Hopkins University for 2 years.

=== Public health physician and health administrator ===
Upon return to Australia, Horvath trained in public health medicine and health administration. She served as the chief executive officer of the Central Sydney Health Services, the predecessor of Sydney South West Area Health Service, itself a predecessor of Sydney Local Health District (LHD) and South West Sydney LHD.

Horvath served as the first community physician at Mount Druitt Centre in the early days of the Western Metropolitan Health Region. She also established community nurses at all schools and a back-up service at the Mount Druitt shopping centre, which became the pattern for community health services delivery in Western Sydney. This led to her becoming Principal Adviser in Community Services in the Health Commission of New South Wales, which were formative years for the establishment of the National Community Health Program under the Whitlam government. Diana was responsible for the direction of the program in New South Wales and for negotiating with the Federal Health Department and the Hospitals and Health Services Commission.

== Honours ==
Horvath was made an Officer of the Order of Australia in the 1995 Queen's Birthday Honours for "service to health administration and to medicine particularly through advancing medical teaching and medical research". She was awarded the Centenary Medal in 2001 for "service to Australian society in business leadership".

Horvath was awarded the Sidney Sax medal in 1992, the pre-eminent prize awarded by the Australian Healthcare and Hospitals Association.

== Personal life ==
Horvath is married to her classmate, Professor John Horvath. After graduation and three years' practice as junior doctors in Sydney, the two worked together at Johns Hopkins Hospital in Maryland in the United States in the 1970s before returning to Australia.

The Horvaths have two children. One is a medical oncologist at the Chris O'Brien Lifehouse near the Royal Prince Alfred Hospital and a graduate of the Horvaths' alma mater, the University of Sydney; the other is an arts/law graduate of the Australian National University.
