= Richard Smallwood (doctor) =

Australian doctor (1937–2024)

Professor Richard Smallwood AO

Chief Medical Officer
- In office 1 November 1999 – 30 June 2003
- Preceded by: Judith Whitworth
- Succeeded by: John Horvath

Personal details
- Born: Richard Alan Smallwood; 28 January 1937
- Died: 1 June 2024 (aged 87) Melbourne, Australia
- Education: University of Melbourne
- Profession: Medical doctor

Richard Alan Smallwood AO (28 January 1937 – 1 June 2024) was an Australian doctor and Chief Medical Officer of Australia between 1999 and 2003.

== Life and career ==
Smallwood was born on 28 January 1937. He graduated from University of Melbourne with a Bachelor of Medicine, Bachelor of Surgery in 1960 and Doctor of Medicine in 1964. Smallwood then trained at Royal Free Hospital in London and at Boston University School of Medicine. He returned to Australia in 1970 and took a role at the Austin Hospital, Melbourne in Melbourne.

He taught at the University of Melbourne for thirty years and is a Professor Emeritus at the university. He has published over 250 papers, mainly focused on the liver and liver disease. He was president of Royal Australasian College of Physicians from 2006 to 2008. In his time as Chief Medical Officer, Smallwood was responsible for addressing public concern about bioterrorism and the SARS epidemic.

Smallwood was made an Officer of the Order of Australia in the 1997 Queen's Birthday Honours for "service to medicine, particularly in the field of gastroenterology, to research through the National Health and Medical Research Council, and to education". He was awarded the Centenary Medal in 2001 for "service to public health especially as the Chief Medical Officer".

Smallwood died in Melbourne on 1 June 2024, at the age of 87.

Government offices
Preceded by Judith Whitworth	Chief Medical Officer; 1999–2003	Succeeded by John Horvath
