= Paul Kelly (doctor) =

Australian Chief Medical Officer

Professor Paul Kelly

Chief Medical Officer
- In office 29 June 2020 – 21 October 2024 (Acting: 29 June – 22 December 2020)
- Preceded by: Brendan Murphy
- Succeeded by: Tony Lawler

Personal details
- Profession: Epidemiologist

Paul M. Kelly is an Australian public health physician, epidemiologist and public servant who was the Chief Medical Officer (CMO) of Australia, having served from June 2020 to October 2024. He succeeded Brendan Murphy, who became the Secretary of the Department of Health.

Kelly is also the head of the Australian Health Protection Principal Committee and in that role an adviser to the National Cabinet of Australia created to respond to the COVID-19 pandemic.

In the past, Kelly assumed a leadership role in the FluCAN project, a national system used to track people hospitalised with influenza, which helps to determine the efficacy of the flu vaccine.

On 22 December 2020, Kelly was officially appointed to the role of Chief Medical Officer on a permanent basis, having previously served in an acting capacity.

In 2022, Kelly reportedly advised against instituting mandatory COVID-19 tests for travellers from China, though the advice was ignored in favor of adopting a policy more in-line with other countries around the world, including the United States, France, and the United Kingdom.

He was elected a Fellow of the Australian Academy of Health and Medical Sciences in 2025.

Government offices
Preceded by Brendan Murphy	Chief Medical Officer; 2020–2024	Succeeded by Tony Lawler
