= Chief Medical Officer (Australia) =

Principal health advisor to the government of Australia

The Chief Medical Officer is the principal health advisor to the Australian government. The position is a medical appointment, reporting to the Departmental secretary for the Department of Health, Disability and Ageing. The position is responsible for the Office of Health Protection Committee which itself has responsibility for biosecurity, immunisation and disease surveillance. The position is also responsible for "maintaining high-quality relationships between the department, the medical profession, medical colleges, universities and other key stakeholders". Other responsibilities of the position vary according to the skills and background of the officeholder. The position was created in November 1982 because the newly appointed Director-General of Health was not a doctor. The position is an advisory in nature and does not have executive or operational authority.

As of 1 June 2025, the Chief Medical Officer is Professor Michael Kidd, who succeeded Tony Lawler.

As of 23 January 2021, the joint Deputy Chief Medical Officers were Nick Coatsworth, Ruth Vine and Michael Kidd. In May 2020, psychiatrist Ruth Vine was appointed the first Deputy Chief Medical Officer for Mental Health.

Previous officers include John Horvath in 2003, Jim Bishop in 2009, and Chris Baggoley from August 2011 until 2016. The role has recently been focused on immigration and related health issues, as well as the ongoing COVID-19 pandemic. The position is head of the Australian Health Protection Committee and in that role an adviser to the National Cabinet of Australia, created in response to the pandemic.

In June 2024, former Deputy Chief Medical Officer Nick Coatsworth admitted he had not had a COVID vaccine for two years and stated he would not be getting any more vaccinations for the virus.

== Annual reports ==
Separate printed reports from the officer were available before 2003; after that time they became incorporated into the departmental reports.

== List of Chief Medical Officers ==
- David de Souza (1983–1988)
- Tony Adams (1988–1997)
- Judith Whitworth (1997–1999)
- Richard Smallwood (1999–2003)
- John Horvath (2003–2009)
- Jim Bishop (2009–2011)
- Chris Baggoley (2011–2016)
- Brendan Murphy (2016–2020)
- Paul Kelly (2020–2024)
- Tony Lawler (2024–2025)
- Michael Kidd (2025–present)

== Related roles and terminology ==
=== States and territories ===
Most of the principal health advisors in each state and territory bear the title Chief Health Officer (CHO), apart from South Australia (Chief Public Health Officer) and Tasmania (Director of Public Health). During the COVID-19 pandemic in Australia, the state CHOs became prominent as advisors regarding the state responses, and in particular closure of state borders. The CMOs/CHOs are part of the Australian Health Protection Committee which advises the National Cabinet on health matters, which has been particularly important during the pandemic.

As of 2025, the principal health advisors in each state and territory are:

- Australian Capital Territory: Kerryn Coleman, CHO
- New South Wales: Kerry Chant, CHO
- Northern Territory: Paul Burgess, CHO
- Queensland: Dr Marianne Gale, CHO
- South Australia: Nicola Spurrier, Chief Public Health Officer
- Tasmania: Dr Dinesh Arya, Chief Medical Officer
- Victoria: Dr Caroline McElnay, CHO
- Western Australia: Andrew Robertson, CHO

=== In sport ===
Many of the major professional sports bodies in Australia, including the Australian Institute of Sport, appoint a Chief Medical Officer, usually a sport and exercise medicine physician, to advise on medical matters.
