= Judith Whitworth =

Australian renal medical researcher and Chief Medical Officer

Judith Whitworth AC FRACP

Chief Medical Officer
- In office 1997–1999
- Succeeded by: Richard Smallwood

Personal details
- Born: Judith Ann Whitworth; 1 April 1944 (age 82)
- Education: University of Melbourne
- Profession: medical doctor

Judith Ann Whitworth (born 1 April 1944) is an Australian medical researcher in the areas of kidney function and blood pressure. Now an emeritus professor, she is the former director of the John Curtin School of Medical Research and Howard Florey Professor of Medical Research at the Australian National University (ANU).

== Education ==
Judith Ann Whitworth was born 1 April 1944. She graduated from the University of Melbourne with a degree in medicine in 1967 then worked first at Royal Melbourne Hospital and then the Queen Elizabeth Hospital in Adelaide. She was awarded Doctor of Medicine by the University of Melbourne in 1974. Her 1977 thesis on "Steroids and Hypertension in the Sheep gained her a PhD from the Howard Florey Institute of Experimental Physiology and Medicine and Department of Physiology at the University of Melbourne.

In 1992, Whitworth received a DSc from the University of Melbourne for her thesis, "Steroid Hypertension in Man, Rat and Sheep."

== Career ==
Prior to her move to academia, Whitworth worked in hospitals both in Australia and overseas, including as Research Fellow at the Tenon Hospital in Paris, France in 1973-74 and as Visiting Registrar at Guy's Hospital, London in 1974–75. She was first physician and later nephrologist at the Royal Melbourne Hospital 1978–1991. From 1994 to 1996 Whitworth was chair of the Medical Research Committee of the National Health and Medical Research Council.

In 1997, Whitworth was the first woman to be appointed chief medical officer in the Commonwealth Department of Health and Family Services for a three-year term. She then became Director of the John Curtin School of Medical Research from August 1999 to July 2009. Alongside her academic responsibilities she was president of the High Blood Pressure Research Council of Australia from 1999 to 2001 and chair of the World Health Organisation Global Advisory Committee on Health Research from 2005 to 2011.

Whitworth was honoured to present the Paddy Woolcock Lecture at the biennial Woolcock gala held by the Prince Charles Hospital Foundation in 2014. Earlier lectures had been given by Professor Peter Doherty and Professor Fiona Wood.

She has been a member of the council of the Charles Darwin University from its inception in 2003 to date. She is on the Board of Therapeutic Innovation Australia and chair of its Clinical Trials Infrastructure Committee.

== Awards and honours ==
- Winthrop Travelling Fellowship from Royal Australasian College of Physicians, 1973
- Smith Kline and French Award received from the International Society of Hypertension, 1984
- Howard Florey Medal, 1990
- Appointed Companion of the Order of Australia (AC) in the 2001 Queen's Birthday Honours for "service to the advancement of academic medicine and as a major contributor to research policy and medical research administration in Australia and internationally".
- Received the Centenary Medal in 2001 "services to Australian society through medical research".
- Appointed Honouring Woman ambassador by the Hon Amanda Vanstone in 2002.
- Telstra ACT Business Woman of the Year, 2002
- Australian of the Year for the Australian Capital Territory in 2004
- Awarded Doctor of Medicine (honoris causa) by the University of Sydney on 16 April 2004
- Awarded Honorary Doctor of Science by the University of Glasgow in 2008
- Awarded Doctor of Laws (honoris causa) by the University of Melbourne
- Elected Honorary Fellow of the Australian Academy of Health and Medical Sciences, 2015
- Elected Fellow of the Australian Academy of Technological Sciences and Engineering 2008
- Honorary Life Member of the Australian and New Zealand Society of Nephrology

== Legacy ==
The Judith Whitworth Fellowship for Gender Equity in Science was inaugurated in 2014 in recognition of her work at the Australian National University. It will provide early support for young scientists, particularly women, to take leave to care for their child.

== Selected works ==
- Kincaid-Smith, Priscilla, 1926–2015; Whitworth, Judith A; Allen & Hanburys (1982), Hypertension, mechanisms and management, Adis Health Science Press, ISBN 978-0-86792-005-5
- Firkin, Barry G; Whitworth, Judith A (1987), Dictionary of medical eponyms, Parthenon Publishing Group, ISBN 978-0-940813-15-1
- Lawrence, J. R. (James Roland), 1930-; Whitworth, Judith A (1987), Textbook of renal disease, Churchill Livingstone, ISBN 978-0-443-02853-3
- Kincaid-Smith, Priscilla; Whitworth, Judith A (1987), The kidney : a clinico-pathological study (2nd ed.), Blackwell Scientific, ISBN 978-0-86793-120-4
- Hunyor, S. (Stephen); Whitworth, Judith A (1990), Hypertension management, Maclennan & Petty, ISBN 978-0-86433-052-9
- Becker, Gavin J; Kincaid-Smith, Priscilla, 1926-2015; Whitworth, Judith A (1992), Clinical nephrology in medical practice, Blackwell Scientific Publications, ISBN 978-0-632-03167-2

== Personal life ==
Whitworth was the second wife of the late Professor John Ludbrook, (1929–2017), a medical researcher and surgeon. They had one daughter.

Government offices
Preceded by	Chief Medical Officer; 1997–1999	Succeeded by Richard Smallwood
