= Chris Baggoley =

Australian Chief Medical Officer

Professor Chris Baggoley AO FAHMS

Chief Medical Officer
- In office 30 August 2011 – 4 October 2016
- Preceded by: Jim Bishop
- Succeeded by: Brendan Murphy

Personal details
- Born: Christopher John Baggoley; 9 October 1951 (age 74) Melbourne
- Education: Flinders University
- Profession: Medical doctor

Christopher James Baggoley (born 9 October 1951) is an Australian doctor and the Chief Medical Officer of Australia between 2011 and 2016. As of June 2020 Baggoley is the Chief Medical Advisor for Calvary Care.

Baggoley was appointed to the position of Australia's Chief Medical Officer in August 2011 having acted in the position since April on the resignation of Jim Bishop. As Chief Medical Officer Baggoley contributed to the international response to several epidemics including Ebola, MERS and Zika virus through his work on the World Health Organization's International Health Regulations Emergency Committee. He resigned from the position in 2016 and was replaced by Brendan Murphy.

Baggoley first completed a degree in veterinary science, later enrolling in the Flinders University postgraduate medical course. In his career Baggoley has been director of emergency medicine at Royal Adelaide Hospital, Chief Medical Officer of South Australia and chief executive of the Australian Commission on Safety and Quality in Health Care.

Baggoley was made an Officer of the Order of Australia in the 2013 Queen's Birthday Honours List for "distinguished service to medicine, particularly in the area of emergency medicine as a clinician, to medical administration and public health care, and to education". He was elected a Fellow of the Australian Academy of Health and Medical Sciences in 2015.

He was diagnosed with pancreatic cancer in 2019.

Government offices
Preceded by Jim Bishop	Chief Medical Officer; 2011–2016	Succeeded by Brendan Murphy
