= Jim Bishop (doctor) =

Australian Chief Medical Officer

Professor Jim Bishop AO

Chief Medical Officer
- In office 2009 – April 2011
- Preceded by: John Horvath
- Succeeded by: Chris Baggoley

Personal details
- Born: James Frank Bishop
- Education: 1972: University of Melbourne, 1979: Royal Australasian College of Physicians, 1979: Royal College of Pathologists of Australia, 1989: University of Melbourne, 1999: University of Melbourne
- Profession: Oncologist
- Medical career
- Research: Cancer chemotherapy, clinical trials, cancer epidemiology, cancer health services and economics, health policy

James Frank Bishop AO is an Australian doctor and the Chief Medical Officer of Australia between 2009 and 2011.

Bishop graduated from University of Melbourne with a Bachelor of Medicine, Bachelor of Surgery in 1972. He was awarded a Fulbright scholarship and spent three years with the National Institutes of Health in the United States. He later practiced at the Peter MacCallum Cancer Centre in Melbourne and after founded the Sydney Cancer Centre at Royal Prince Alfred and Concord Hospitals.

In his role as Chief Medical Officer, Bishop advised the Australian government on its response to the 2009 swine flu pandemic. As CMO, Bishop also looked to focus on prevention measures relating to diet, obesity and tobacco use.

He later became the executive director of the Victorian Comprehensive Cancer Centre and the chair of cancer medicine at the University of Melbourne.

Bishop was made an Officer of the Order of Australia in the 2008 Queen's Birthday Honours for "service to medicine, particularly in the field of cancer treatment and research and through the development of innovative policy, improved public awareness and service delivery programs".

== Notable contributions ==
Bishop has led several medical initiatives in Australia. The following subsections outline two campaigns that have helped change social attitudes towards cancer, in both financial and health terms.

=== Dark Side of Tanning Campaign ===
“The ‘Dark Side of Tanning’ (DSOT) mass media campaign was developed in 2007 to influence attitudes related to tanning”. Dr Bishop was involved in its creation through his role at the Cancer Institute NSW. The messages of the campaign were distributed using many forms of media such as billboard advertising.

Melanoma and other skin cancers world map - Death - WHO2004. Australia is one of the leading countries.

Amongst 15- to 29-year-olds in Australia, melanoma is the most common type of cancer. Further, "in 2008, there were 3,591 new cases of melanoma in NSW (2,127 in males and 1,464 in females) accounting for 10 per cent of all cancers". In the paper, “Exposure to the ‘Dark Side of Tanning’ skin cancer prevention mass media campaign and its association with tanning attitudes in New South Wales, Australia”, it was highlighted that there was a misunderstanding about the side-effects of tanning, mainly misconceptions about the association of a tan with a healthy lifestyle outweighed the health concerns.

The campaign was first aired in the summer of 2007/2008 and was run during the same seasonal period until the summer of 2010/2011. It “centred on three television commercials (referred to as ‘Girl’, ‘Footy’ and ‘Surfer’, respectively) featuring a range of ‘tanner moments’—scenes that aimed to build personal relevance by featuring actors from the target audience”. Moreover, the state governments of Victoria, Queensland, South Australia and Western Australia obtained the licensing rights to use the campaign.

Awards

- 2010: earned an international Sulzberger Institute sun safety award at the sixty-eighth annual meeting of the American Academy of Dermatology.
- 2010: presented with a Gold Australian Advertising Effectiveness (Effie) award in the Government, Corporate and Social Services category.

=== Quit campaigns ===
These marketing campaigns formed part of the NSW Tobacco Action Plan 2005-09 which “set a target of 1 percent reduction per annum in adult smoking prevalence between 2005 and 2009”. This was to be achieved by changing individuals’ smoking habits by “invoking cognitive or emotional responses” through various media publications. These messages formed a vital part of controlling tobacco consumption.

The first media release by the Cancer Institute NSW was on the 18th of April 2006 and was centered around promoting the services offered by the Quitline.

Dr Bishop had this to say when commenting on the cost of smoking in the New South Wales community and how the quit campaigns can alleviate some of the issues:

“We think Quit campaigns are very effective. Collins and Lapsley have done an economic review of the effects of smoking which shows that about $6.6 billion a year is spent in New South Wales on smoking-related illness and people dying early—all of the economic effects. We have estimated that as smoking rates drop by 1% a year over a five-year period the economic return to New South Wales would be between $2.3 billion and $5.8 billion. So the money we spend to drop the smoking rate by 1 per cent, which is essentially what we have achieved over the last year, is very effective in terms of health economics”.

== Notable positions held and achievements ==
=== Roles ===
- 2011–present: Professor of Cancer Medicine, The University of Melbourne
- 2011–present: Executive Director, The Victorian Comprehensive Cancer Centre
- 2009–2011: Chief Medical Officer, Department of Health and Ageing, Australian Government
- 2011: National Director of Human Quarantine, Australian Government
- 2011: Office of Health Protection, Department of Health and Ageing, Canberra
- 2003–2011: Honorary Medical Oncologist, Royal Prince Alfred Hospital, Sydney
- 2003–2009: Chief Cancer Officer for New South Wales
- 2003–2009: CEO, Cancer Institute NSW
- 1995–2003: Director, Sydney Cancer Centre, Royal Prince Alfred and Concord Hospitals
- 1995–2003: Clinical Director, Cancer Services, Central Sydney Area Health Service
- 1995–present: Professor of Medicine, The University of Sydney
- 1990–1995: Director, Division of Haematology and Medical Oncology, Peter MacCallum Cancer Institute, Melbourne

=== Academic achievements ===
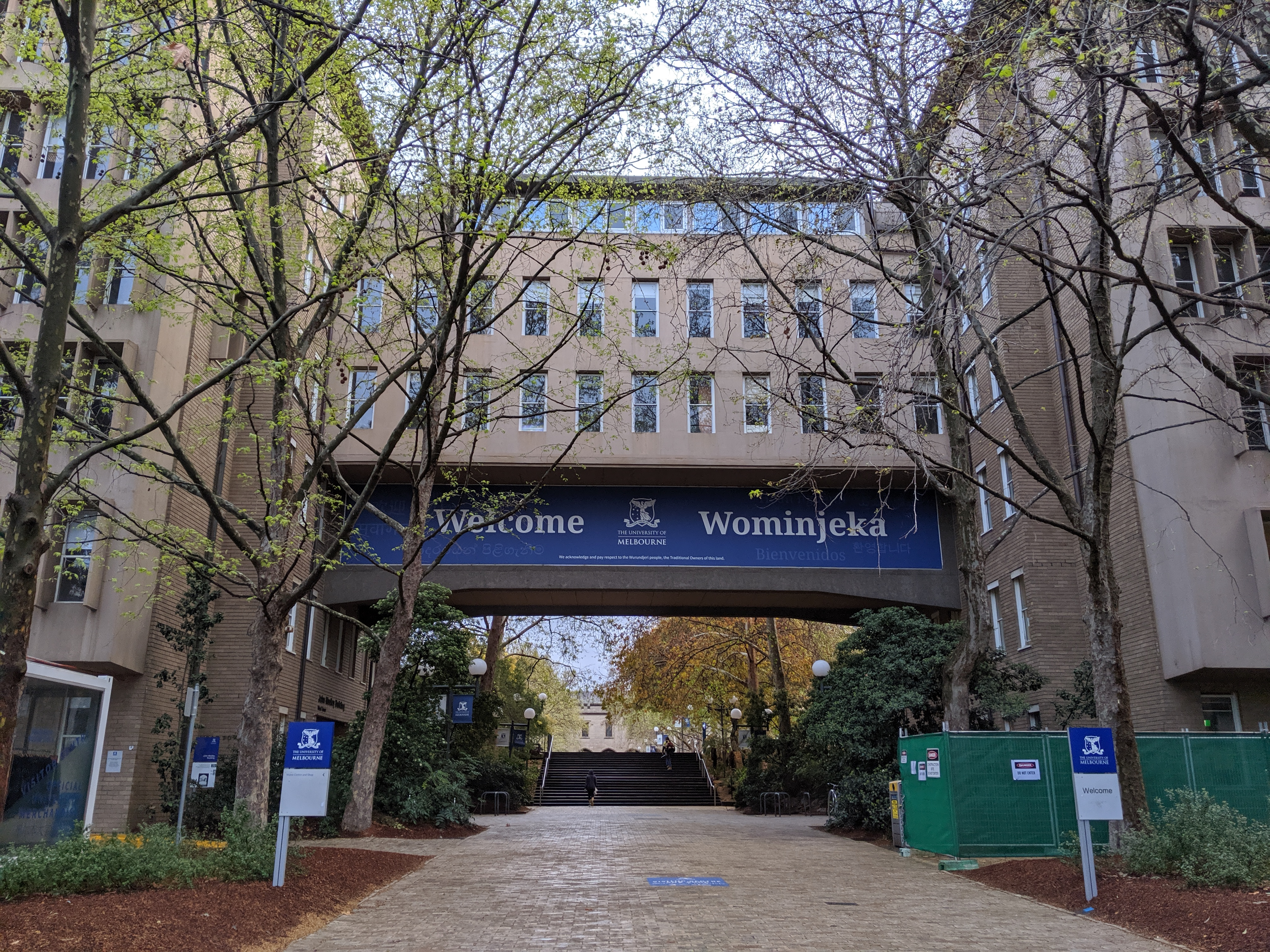
University of Melbourne main entrance where Dr. Bishop studied

- 1972: University of Melbourne, MBBS (Bachelor of Medicine and Bachelor of Surgery)
- 1979: Royal Australasian College of Physicians, FRACP (Fellow of the Royal Australasian College of Physicians)
- 1979: Royal College of Pathologists of Australia, FRCPA (Fellow of the Royal College of Pathologists, Australia)
- 1989: University of Melbourne, M.D. (Doctor of Medicine)
- 1999: University of Melbourne, MMed (Master of Medicine)

== Publications ==
2001

- Horvath, L., Boyer, M., Clarke, S., Beale, P., Beith, J., Underhill, C., Stockler, M. and Bishop, J 2001, 'Carboplatin and vinorelbine in untreated locally advanced and metastatic non-small cell lung cancer,' Lung Cancer, vol.32, no.2, pp. 173–178. doi:10.1016/S0169-5002(00)00218-X
- Matthews, J., Bishop, J., Young, G., Juneja, S., Lowenthal, R., Garson, O., Cobcroft, R., Dodds, A., Enno, A., Gillett, E. and Hermann, R, et al. 2001, 'Patterns of failure with increasing intensification of induction chemotherapy for acute myeloid leukaemia,' British Journal of Haematology, vol.113, no.3, pp. 727–736. doi:10.1046/j.1365-2141.2001.02756.x
- Ong, S., Clarke, S., Bishop, J., Dodds, H. and Rivory, L 2001, 'Toxicity of irinotecan (CPT-11) and hepato-renal dysfunction,' Anti-Cancer Drugs: international journal on anti-cancer agents, vol.12, no.7, pp. 619–625. doi:10.1097/00001813-200108000-00009
- Rivory, L., Clarke, S., Boyer, M. and Bishop, J 2001, 'Highly sensitive analysis of the antifolate pemetrexed sodium, a new cancer agent, in human plasma and urine by high-performance liquid chromatography,' Journal of Chromatography B: Analytical Technologies in the Biomedical and Life Sciences, vol.765, no.2, pp. 135–140. doi:10.1016/S0378-4347(01)00406-6

2003

- Millward, M., Boyer, M., Lehnert, M., Clarke, S., Rischin, D., Goh, B., Wong, J., McNeil, E. and Bishop, J 2003, 'Docetaxel and carboplatin is an active regimen in advanced non-small-cell lung cancer: a phase II study in Caucasian and Asian patients,' Annals of Oncology, vol.14, no.3, pp. 449–454. doi:10.1093/annonc/mdg118

2007

- Bishop, J. F., Cotter, T., Perez, D. and Dessaix, A 2007, 'Impact of a graphic health warnings tobacco campaign in Australia,' Journal of Thoracic Oncology, vol.2, no.8, pp. S384-S385. doi:10.1097/01.JTO.0000283241.14454.e3

2008

- Cotter, T., Perez, D. A., Dessaix, A. L. and Bishop, J. F 2008, 'Smokers respond to anti-tobacco mass media campaigns in NSW by calling the Quitline,' NSW Public Health Bulletin, vol.19, no.4, pp. 68–68. doi:10.1071/nb07098
- Boyle, P., Anderson, B., Andersson, L., Ariyaratne, Y., Auleley, G., Barbacid, M., Bartelink, H., Baselga, J., Behbehani, K., Belardelli, F. and Berns, A, et al. 2008, 'Need for global action for cancer control,' Annals of Oncology, vol.19, no.9, pp. 1519–1521. doi:10.1093/annonc/mdn426
- Tracey, E., Roder, D., Zorbas, H., Villanueva, E., Jelfs, P. and Bishop, J 2008, 'Survival and degree of spread for female breast cancers in New South Wales from 1980 to 2003: implications for cancer control,' Cancer Causes & Control, vol.19, no.10, pp. 1121–1130. doi:10.1007/s10552-008-9177-y

2009

- Bishop, J 2009, 'Managing Pandemic (H1N1) 2009 influenza: A national health response,' Aus. J. Emerg. Manage., vol.24, no.3, pp. 5–6.
- Tracey, E. A., Roder, D. M., Francis, J., Zorbas, H. M., Hacker, N. F. and Bishop, J. F 2009, 'Reasons for Improved Survival From Ovarian Cancer in New South Wales, Australia, Between 1980 and 2003 Implications for Cancer Control,' International Journal of Gynecological Cancer, vol.19, no.4, pp. 591–599. doi:10.1111/IGC.0b013e3181a3a436
- Tracey, E., Roder, D., Luke, C. and Bishop, J 2009, 'Bladder cancer survivals in New South Wales, Australia: why do women have poorer survival than men?,' BJU Int., vol.104, no.4, pp. 498–504. doi:10.1111/j.1464-410x.2009.08527.x
- Bishop, J. F., Murnane, M. P. and Owen, R 2009, 'Australia's Winter with the 2009 Pandemic Influenza A (H1N1) Virus,' New England Journal of Medicine, vol.361, no.27, pp. 2591–2594. doi:10.1056/NEJMp0910445
- Stavrou, E. P., Baker, D. F. and Bishop, J. F 2009, 'Maternal smoking during pregnancy and childhood cancer in New South Wales: a record linkage investigation,' Cancer Causes & Control, vol.20, no.9, pp. 1551–1558. doi:10.1007/s10552-009-9400-5
- Stavrou, E. P., McElroy, H. J., Baker, D. F., Smith, G. and Bishop, J. F 2009, 'Adenocarcinoma of the oesophagus: incidence and survival rates in New South Wales, 1972–2005,' Medical Journal of Australia, vol.191, no.6, pp. 310–314. doi:10.5694/j.1326-5377.2009.tb02813.x

2010

- Cotter, T., Perez, D., Dunlop, S., Hung, W. T., Dessaix, A. and Bishop, J. F 2010, 'The case for recycling and adapting anti-tobacco mass media campaigns,' Tobacco Control, vol.19, no.6, pp. 514–517. doi:10.1136/tc.2009.035022
- Morrell, S., Perez, D. A., Hardy, M., Cotter, T. and Bishop, J. F 2010, 'Outcomes from a mass media campaign to promote cervical screening in NSW, Australia,' Journal of Epidemiology and Community Health, vol.64, no.9, pp. 777–783. doi:10.1136/jech.2008.084657
- Murray, P., Kerridge, I., Tiley, C., Catanzariti, A., Welberry, H., Lean, C., Sinclair, S., Bishop, J. and Bradstock, K 2010, 'Enrolment of patients to clinical trials in haematological cancer in New South Wales: current status, perceived barriers and opportunities for improvement,' Intern. Med. J., vol.40, no.2, pp. 133–138. doi:10.1111/j.1445-5994.2009.01911.x
- Bishop, J 2010, 'Medical oncology group of Australia cancer achievement award - Cancer, then and now,' Cancer Forum, vol.34, no.1, pp. 31–32.

2011

- Harvey, S. L., Francis, J. E., McBride, A. J., Bishop, J. F. and Phillips, K 2011, 'Medication to prevent breast cancer - too much to swallow?,' Medical Journal of Australia, vol.195, no.11-12, pp. 646–649. doi:10.5694/mja11.10830
- Rankin, N. M., Barron, J. A., Lane, L. G., Mason, C. A., Sinclair, S. and Bishop, J. F 2011, 'Psychosocial oncology services in New South Wales,' Australian Health Review, vol.35, no.2, pp. 156–163. doi:10.1071/AH08730
- Cotter, T., Hung, W. T., Perez, D., Dunlop, S. and Bishop, J 2011, 'Squeezing new life out of an old Sponge: how to modernise an anti-smoking media campaign to capture a new market,' Australian and New Zealand Journal of Public Health, vol.35, no.1, pp. 75–80. doi:10.1111/j.1753-6405.2010.00654.x
- Olver, I. N., Falleiro, S. J., Marson, M. L. and Bishop, J. F 2011, 'A case study of a single ethics committee for multicentre trials,' MEDICAL JOURNAL OF AUSTRALIA, vol.195, no.10, pp. 582–583. doi:10.5694/mja11.10484

2012

- Mauguen, A., Le Pechoux, C., Saunders, M. I., Schild, S. E., Turrisi, A. T., Baumann, M., Sause, W. T., Ball, D., Belani, C. P., Bonner, J. A. and Zajusz, A, et al. 2012, 'Hyperfractionated or Accelerated Radiotherapy in Lung Cancer: An Individual Patient Data Meta-Analysis,' Journal of Clinical Oncology, vol.30, no.22, pp. 2788–2797. doi:10.1200/JCO.2012.41.6677
- Scolyer, R., Bishop, J. and Thompson, J 2012, 'Primary Melanoma of the Lung,' Textbook of Uncommon Cancer, pp. 335–341. doi:10.1002/9781118464557.ch23

2013

- Lueza, B., Mauguen, A., Pignon, J., Rivero-Arias, O. and Bonastre, J 2016, 'Difference in Restricted Mean Survival Time for Cost-Effectiveness Analysis Using Individual Patient Data Meta-Analysis: Evidence from a Case Study,' PLOS ONE, vol.11, no.3, pp. 12-. doi:10.1371/journal.pone.0150032

2016

- Lacey, K., Bishop, J. F., Cross, H. L., Chondros, P., Lyratzopoulos, G. and Emery, J. D 2016, 'Presentations to general practice before a cancer diagnosis in Victoria: a cross-sectional survey,' Medical Journal of Australia, vol.205, no.2, pp. 66–71. doi:10.5694/mja15.01169
- Lueza, B., Mauguen, A., Pignon, J., Rivero-Arias, O. and Bonastre, J 2016, 'Difference in Restricted Mean Survival Time for Cost-Effectiveness Analysis Using Individual Patient Data Meta-Analysis: Evidence from a Case Study,' PLOS ONE, vol.11, no.3, pp. 12-. doi:10.1371/journal.pone.0150032

2017

- Jefford, M., Ward, A. C., Lisy, K., Lacey, K., Emery, J. D., Glaser, A. W., Cross, H., Krishnasamy, M., McLachlan, S. and Bishop, J 2017, 'Patient-reported outcomes in cancer survivors: a population-wide cross-sectional study,' Supportive Care in Cancer, vol.25, no.10, pp. 3171–3179. doi:10.1007/s00520-017-3725-5

2018

- Tran, Q., Ward, A., Lisy, K., Bishop, J. and Jefford, M 2018, 'High proportion of prostate cancer survivors continue to experience a negative impact on quality of life long after diagnosis: Patient reported outcomes for an Australian population-based sample,' Annals of Oncology, vol.29 pp. 2-. doi:10.1093/annonc/mdy300.074

2019

- Lisy, K., Ward, A., Schofield, P., Hulbert-Williams, N., Bishop, J. and Jefford, M 2019, 'Patient-reported outcomes of sexual and gender minority cancer survivors in Australia,' Psycho-Oncology, vol.28, no.2, pp. 442–444. doi:10.1002/pon.4956
- Loring, D. W., Bowden, S. C., Staikova, E., Bishop, J. A., Drane, D. L. and Goldstein, F. C 2019, 'NIH Toolbox Picture Sequence Memory Test for Assessing Clinical Memory Function: Diagnostic Relationship to the Rey Auditory Verbal Learning Test,' Archives of Clinical Neuropsychology, vol.34, no.2, pp. 268–276. doi:10.1093/arclin/acy028

== Citations ==
Government offices
Preceded by John Horvath	Chief Medical Officer; 2009–2011	Succeeded by Chris Baggoley
