= Australian Health Protection Principal Committee =

Australian Health Protection Committee

Committee overview
- Formed: 2 July 2009
- Preceding Committee: National Public Health Partnership
- Committee executive: Professor Michael Kidd, Commonwealth Chief Medical Officer (chair)
- Parent department: Governance: National Cabinet; Secretariat: Department of Health, Disability and Ageing
- Website: www.health.gov.au/committees-and-groups/australian-health-protection-principal-committee-ahppc

The Australian Health Protection Committee (AHPC) is the peak decision-making committee for public health emergency management and disease control in the Commonwealth of Australia. It is chaired by the Chief Medical Officer of the Australian Government and comprises the chief health officers of the states and territories.

The AHPC's stated function (according to website as of November 2020) is to provide advice to the Australian Health Ministers' Advisory Council (AHMAC) "on health protection matters and national priorities", and AHMAC formerly supported the Council of Australian Governments (COAG) Health Council. However, since the COVID-19 pandemic in Australia, the AHPC has provided advice directly to the National Cabinet.

== History and role ==
The AHPC was established by the Australian Health Ministers’ Advisory Council (AHMAC) on 2 July 2009 to provide expert advice on high-level and intergovernmental coordination of public health emergency management. The AHPC is tasked with providing advice on health protection in the context of emerging health threats, infectious disease, environmental health, and natural disasters. The AHPC also collaborates with state and territory governments to develop consistency and standards for national health protection.

The AHPC is also responsible for authorising the deployment of the Australian Medical Assistance Team (AUSMAT).

=== COVID-19 pandemic ===
In response to the ongoing COVID-19 pandemic, the AHPC has provided expert advice to the National Security Committee, the Cabinet of Australia, and the National Cabinet of Australia. The National COVID-19 Health and Research Advisory Committee was established in April 2020 to provide advice on Australia's health response to the COVID-19 pandemic to the Commonwealth Chief Medical Officer and the AHPC.

== Membership ==
The AHPC is chaired by the Chief Medical Officer of the Australian Government and as of November 2020 comprises the Chief Health Officers of the State and Territory Governments. It previously included (as of at least 2017) nominated health disaster officials, the chairs of the AHPC standing committees, a representative from Emergency Management Australia of the Department of Home Affairs, the Surgeon-General of the Australian Defence Force, a representative from the New Zealand Ministry of Health, and other public health and clinical experts.

Jurisdiction	Position	Office holder
Commonwealth	Chief Medical Officer and Director of Human Biosecurity (chair)	Michael Kidd
New South Wales	Chief Health Officer and Deputy Secretary Population and Public Health	Kerry Chant
Victoria	Chief Health Officer	Dr Caroline McElnay
Queensland	Chief Health Officer	Dr Marianne Gale
Western Australia	Chief Health Officer	Andrew Robertson
South Australia	Chief Public Health Officer	Nicola Spurrier
Tasmania	Chief Health Officer	Dr Dinesh Arya
Australian Capital Territory	Chief Health Officer	Kerryn Coleman
Northern Territory	Chief Health Officer	Paul Burgess

Jurisdiction	Position	Office holder
Australian Defence Force	Surgeon-General and Commander Joint Health	Rear Admiral Sarah Sharkey
Commonwealth	Chief Nursing and Midwifery Officer	Alison McMillan
Commonwealth	Deputy Chief Medical Officer	Jenny Firman
Commonwealth	Deputy Chief Medical Officer	Dr Claire Behm

== Standing committee oversight ==
The AHPC also provides strategic direction and support to five standing committees:

- Communicable Diseases Network Australia (CDNA)
- National Health Emergency Management Standing Committee (NHEMS)
- Public Health Laboratory Network (PHLN)
- Environmental Health Standing Committee (enHealth)
- Blood Borne Viruses and Sexually Transmitted Infections Standing Committee (BBVSS)

As of November 2020 it also oversees one time-limited advisory group, the Aged Care Advisory Group.

== Secretariat ==
The Office of Health Protection of the Department of Health, Disability and Ageing provides secretariat support functions for the AHPC and its standing committees.

== See also ==
- National COVID-19 Coordination Commission
- National Cabinet of Australia
- Council of Australian Governments
- National Security Committee
- War Cabinet of Australia
