= John Horvath (doctor) =

Australian Chief Medical Officer

John Horvath AO FRACP

Chief Medical Officer
- In office September 2003 – 2009
- Preceded by: Richard Smallwood
- Succeeded by: Jim Bishop

Personal details
- Born: John Stephen Horvath
- Spouse: Professor Diana Horvath AO
- Education: Sydney Medical School of the University of Sydney
- Profession: Medical doctor Independent non-executive director of Crown Resorts

John Stephen Horvath AO is an Australian medical doctor and the Chief Medical Officer of Australia between 2003 and 2009. As of June 2020 Horvath is Deputy Chairman of Crown Resorts Limited. Horvath is also Group Chief Medical Officer of Ramsay Health Care and a Director of the Ramsay Hospital Research Foundation and the Gallipoli Medical Research Foundation.

== Early life and education ==
Horvath's parents, Stephen and Ann, emigrated in 1948 when John was 4 to escape the Communist takeover of Hungary.

Horvath graduated from the University of Sydney with a Bachelor of Medicine, Bachelor of Surgery in 1968.

== Career ==
Horvath practiced for 30 years at Royal Prince Alfred Hospital in Sydney, including as director of renal and transplant services between 1997 and 2003. He is distinguished as having been the late Kerry Packer's nephrologist and was instrumental to the Royal Prince Alfred Hospital's profile as a kidney-transplantation facility.

Horvath was also deputy chair of the World Health Organization's international cancer research institute in Lyon in France.

=== Chief Medical Officer of Australia ===
Horvath served as the Chief Medical Officer of Australia and chaired the National Influenza Pandemic Action Committee. In planning Australia's response to a flu pandemic, Horvath said, alluding to measures that have been used in the years since his tenure as the Chief Medical Officer, "There's lots of things we could do before border closures: alerts, screening, being aware one of our neighbouring countries has a high-level alert … then there's the no-brainers: we want to make it socially unacceptable to go to work coughing, spluttering, infecting the entire staff. In Japan, it's regarded as very bad manners".

== Honours ==
Horvath was made an Officer of the Order of Australia in the 2001 Australia Day Honours for "service to medicine, particularly in the field of hypertension, as a consultant physician and a clinical tutor of medicine, and to medical administration.".

== Personal life ==
Horvath is married to his classmate Professor Diana Horvath. After graduation and 3 years' practice as junior doctors in Sydney, the two worked together for 2 years at Johns Hopkins Hospital in Maryland in the United States before returning to Australia.

The Horvaths have two children, one of whom, Lisa, is a medical oncologist at the Chris O'Brien Lifehouse near the Royal Prince Alfred Hospital and a graduate of the Horvath's alma mater, the University of Sydney; another, Penny, is an arts/law graduate of the Australian National University.

Government offices
Preceded by Richard Smallwood	Chief Medical Officer; 2003–2009	Succeeded by Jim Bishop
