= Kerry Chant =

Australian physician and medical officer

Kerry Chant AO PSM
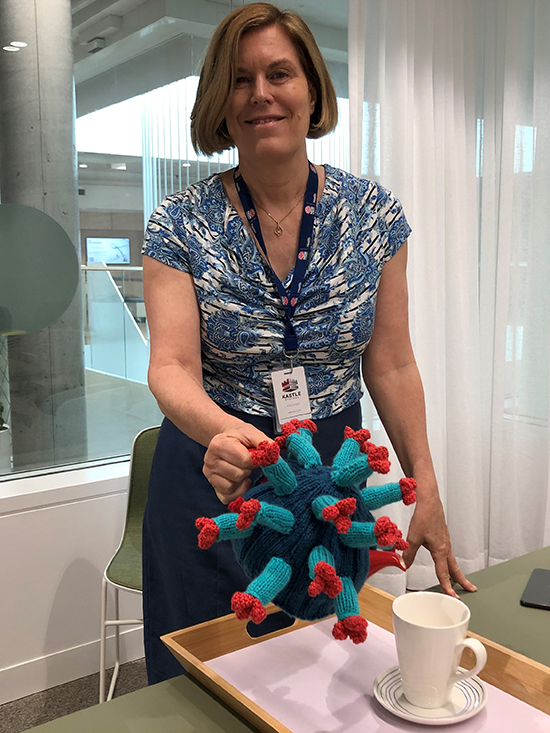
- Chant in 2020

Chief Health Officer of New South Wales
- Incumbent
- Assumed office 2008
- Premier: Morris Iemma; Nathan Rees; Kristina Keneally; Barry O'Farrell; Mike Baird; Gladys Berejiklian; Dominic Perrottet; Chris Minns
- Deputy: Jeremy McAnulty; Marianne Gale
- Preceded by: Greg Stewart

Personal details
- Education: University of New South Wales
- Profession: Public health officer

Kerry Gai Chant AO PSM is an Australian public health physician who has been the chief health officer of New South Wales, Australia, since 2008. She gained prominence during the COVID-19 pandemic in Australia providing regular public health advice for New South Wales, a contribution for which she was named the state's Woman of the Year in March 2021.

== Early life ==
Chant grew up in Punchbowl, New South Wales. She attended the Danebank Anglican School for Girls, graduating in 1980. Chant worked in retail jobs and a pharmacy before studying medicine. She attended the University of New South Wales where she completed a Bachelor of Medicine, Bachelor of Surgery in 1987, a Master in Health Administration in 1991 and a Master of Public Health in 1995.

== Career ==
Chant has been with the New South Wales Health Department since 1991 working in the areas of virus infections, communicable diseases prevention and control and Indigenous health. She is currently Deputy Secretary of Population and Public Health and NSW Chief Health Officer, a role for which she has been recognised for her contribution, having held the longest service to date. Prior to this, Chant was Director, Public Health Unit in Sydney South West Area Health Service; Director, Health Protection and Deputy Chief Health Officer. In 2013, she was threatened for advocating fluoridation of the water supply in the City of Lismore. Chant is an author of multiple research papers on public health matters, particularly related to infectious diseases, including the discovery of the Menangle virus. During the state's response to the COVID-19 pandemic, Chant often appeared alongside premier Gladys Berejiklian when providing health updates and advice to the public.

== Awards ==
- 2021: NSW Premier's Woman of the Year, and Woman of Excellence Award
- 2020: UNSW Chancellor's Award for Exceptional Alumni Achievement
- 2015: Australian Public Service Medal for "outstanding public service to population health in New South Wales"
- 2022: Appointed Officer of the Order of Australia in the 2022 Queen's Birthday Honours for "distinguished service to the people of New South Wales through public health administration and governance, and to medicine".
