= Council of Australian Governments =

Defunct Australian subnational intergovernmental forum

COAG
- Council of Australian Governments
- Predecessor: Interstate Conference of Premiers
- Successor: National Cabinet
- Formation: 1992
- Dissolved: 29 May 2020
- Type: subnational intergovernmental organisation
- Region served: Australia
- Members: Premiers and chief ministers of the Australian states and territories; Prime Minister of Australia; President of the Australian Local Government Association

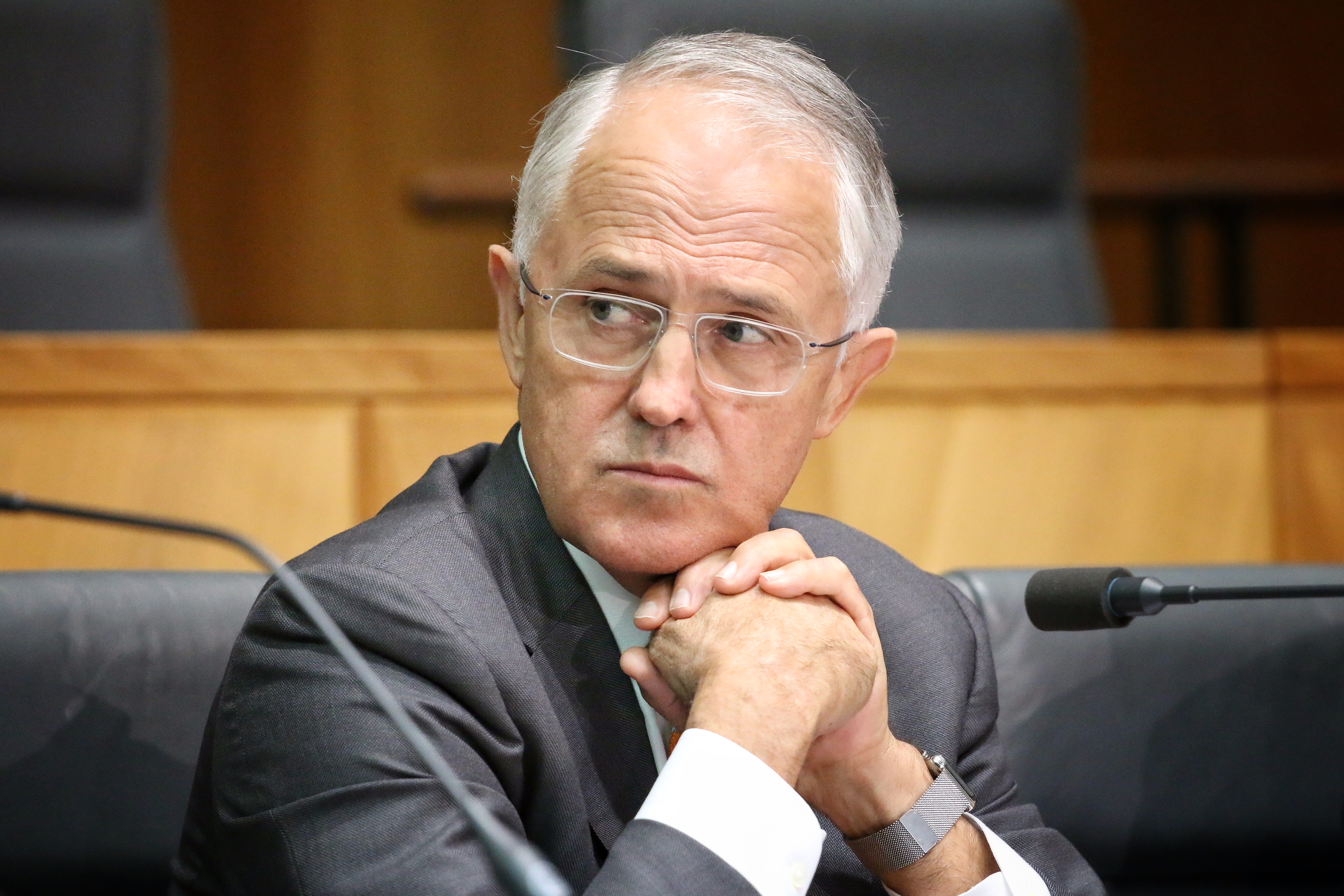
Prime Minister Malcolm Turnbull attending a COAG meeting in 2016

The Council of Australian Governments (COAG) was the primary intergovernmental forum in Australia from 1992 to 2020. Comprising the federal government, the governments of the six states and two mainland territories and the Australian Local Government Association, it managed governmental relations within Australia's federal system within the scope of matters of national importance.

On 29 May 2020, Prime Minister Scott Morrison announced that COAG would be replaced by a new structure based on the National Cabinet implemented during the COVID-19 pandemic.

== History ==
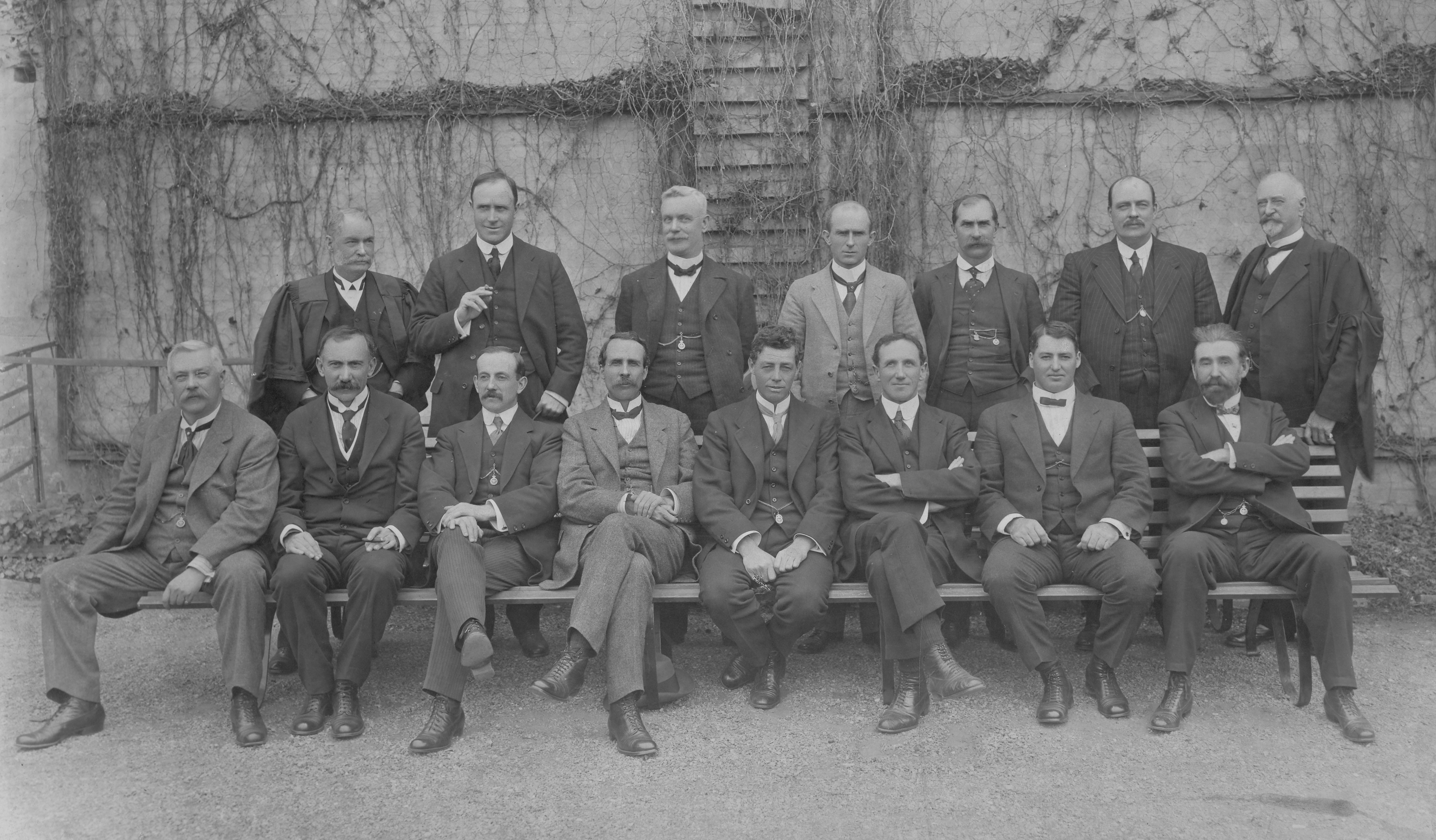
Attendees at the 1916 Premiers' Conference in Adelaide

COAG grew out of the Premiers' Conferences, which had been held for many decades. These were limited to the premiers of the six states and the Prime Minister. A related organisation is the Loan Council, which coordinates borrowing by the federal and state and territorial governments of Australia.

COAG was established in May 1992 after agreement by the then Prime Minister (Paul Keating), premiers and chief ministers, and it first met in December 1992. It was chaired by the Prime Minister. It met to debate and co-ordinate government activities between the federal and state or territorial governments and between the state and territorial governments themselves as well as issues affecting local government.

COAG differed from the United States' National Governors Association or Canada's Council of the Federation, because these bodies only include state/provincial representatives, whereas COAG also included federal and local representatives.

At a COAG meeting on 13 March 2020, it was announced that a new National Cabinet was being formed of the Prime Minister and the premiers and chief ministers of the states and territories to coordinate the response to the COVID-19 pandemic in Australia.

On 29 May 2020, Prime Minister Scott Morrison announced that COAG would be replaced by a new structure based on the National Cabinet.

== Final membership ==
Name	Office held	In office since	Party
Scott Morrison MP	Prime Minister of Australia	24 August 2018	Liberal
Gladys Berejiklian MP	Premier of New South Wales	23 January 2017	Liberal
Daniel Andrews MP	Premier of Victoria	4 December 2014	Labor
Annastacia Palaszczuk MP	Premier of Queensland	14 February 2015	Labor
Mark McGowan MLA	Premier of Western Australia	17 March 2017	Labor
Steven Marshall MP	Premier of South Australia	19 March 2018	Liberal
Peter Gutwein MHA	Premier of Tasmania	20 January 2020	Liberal
Andrew Barr MLA	Chief Minister of the Australian Capital Territory	11 December 2014	Labor
Michael Gunner MLA	Chief Minister of the Northern Territory	31 August 2016	Labor
Mayor David O'Loughlin	President of the Australian Local Government Association	November 2016	Labor

== COAG and state finances ==
Australia is believed to be the first federation to have introduced a formal system of horizontal fiscal equalisation (HFE) which was introduced in 1933 to compensate States which have a lower capacity to raise revenue. Many federations use fiscal equalisation to reduce the inequalities in the fiscal capacities of sub-national governments arising from the differences in their geography, demography, natural endowments and economies. However the level of equalisation sought varies. In Australia, the objective is full equalisation.

Full equalisation means that, after HFE, each of the six states, the Australian Capital Territory and the Northern Territory would have the capacity to provide services and the associated infrastructure at the same standard, if each state or territory made the same effort to raise revenue from its own sources and operated at the same level of efficiency.

Currently the funds distributed to achieve HFE are the revenues raised from the Goods and Services Tax (GST), currently about AUD50bn a year. The distribution of GST required to achieve HFE is decided by the Federal Treasurer each year, on the basis of advice provided by the Commonwealth Grants Commission (CGC).

Achieving HFE does not mean that the states and territories are directed how to raise revenue or how to spend their funds. GST revenue grants from the Commonwealth are unencumbered and available for any purpose. Accordingly, HFE equalises fiscal capacity, not fiscal policies which remain for the states and territories to decide for themselves. It does not result in the same level of services or taxes in all states and territories, direct that the states and territories must achieve any specified level of service in any area, nor impose actual budget outcomes in accordance with the Commission's calculations.

At its meeting on 13 December 2013, COAG agreed to streamline the COAG council system and refocus on COAG's priorities over the next 12 to 18 months. The reforms led to a removal of the distinction between standing and select councils.

=== List of councils ===
At its dissolution, there were twelve COAG councils:

- Federal Financial Relations Council
- Disability Reform Council
- Transport and Infrastructure Council
- Energy Council
- Skills Council
- Council of Attorneys-General
- Education Council
- Health Council
- Joint Council on Closing the Gap
- Indigenous Affairs Council
- Australian Data and Digital Council
- Women’s Safety Council

The COAG Reform Council was established in 2010 as an independent body to advise on reforms of national significance. It was disestablished in 2014.

== Criticism ==
In 2012 a group of 20 environmental organisations released a joint communiqué denouncing the establishment of the COAG Business Advisory Forum and wanted wider representation on the Forum. The groups also opposed the weakening of environmental regulations.

After the forum's abolition in early 2020, journalist Annabel Crabb wrote that, after initial utility in the 1990s, COAG had become a "sclerotic nightmare" producing "communiques of impenetrable bureaucratese". She suggested that the meetings in Canberra had produced a performative element in which state premiers sought to boost their profile at the expense of actual reforms.

== See also ==
- Executive federalism
- National Cabinet of Australia
- Prime Minister and Heads of Devolved Governments Council, Similar body in the United Kingdom
- First Ministers' conference, Similar body in Canada
- National Governors Association, Similar body in the United States of America
- Federal Council of Australasia, pre-1901 equivalent
- Fiscal imbalance in Australia
- Inter-State Commission
- MCEETYA, Ministerial Council on Education, Employment, Training and Youth Affairs
- COAG Reform Council
