= National Cabinet (Australia) =

Australian intergovernmental forum

- Chair: Anthony Albanese (Prime Minister)
- Current members: Chris Minns (NSW); Ben Carroll (Vic); David Crisafulli (Qld); Roger Cook (WA); Peter Malinauskas (SA); Jeremy Rockliff (Tas); Andrew Barr (ACT); Lia Finocchiaro (NT)
- Founded: March 13, 2020; 6 years ago
- Preceded by: Council of Australian Governments
- Affiliated: Australian federal government and the state and territory premiers and chief ministers

Website
- federation.gov.au/national-cabinet

The National Cabinet is the primary Australian intergovernmental decision-making forum composed of the prime minister and state and territory premiers and chief ministers of Australia’s six states and two mainland territories.

Originally established on 13 March 2020 in response to the COVID-19 pandemic, National Cabinet replaced the now-defunct Council of Australian Governments (COAG) as the primary intergovernmental forum on 29 May 2020, citing excessive bureaucracy and infrequent meetings. National Cabinet is composed of the main forum (prime minister, premiers, and chief ministers), and specialised committees focusing on: rural and regional Australia, skills, infrastructure, health, transport, population and migration, and energy.

== History and description ==
The formation of the National Cabinet was announced by Prime Minister Scott Morrison on 13 March 2020, following a meeting of the Council of Australian Governments (COAG). It was created via the "National Partnership on COVID-19 Response" agreement to "coordinate and deliver a consistent national response to COVID-19" during the global COVID-19 pandemic.

The New Zealand Prime Minister, Jacinda Ardern, joined a National Cabinet meeting in May 2020 to discuss the economic benefits of trans-Tasman travel between the two nations.

It has been described as akin to Australia's War Cabinet during the Second World War. At the heights of the pandemic (prior to the widespread rollout of COVID-19 vaccines), meetings of National Cabinet were held using secure video conferencing. National Cabinet has been criticised for its secrecy.

== Role and responsibilities ==
The National Cabinet is responsible for endorsing and coordinating national actions in Australia in response to the coronavirus pandemic. It is advised and supported by the Australian Health Protection Principal Committee (AHPPC), an ongoing body composed of the Chief Medical Officer of the Commonwealth and the Chief Health Officers of each of the states and territories. The AHPPC uses the currently available modelling, research and data to inform the decisions made by the National Cabinet.

The prime minister at the time, Scott Morrison, has said that the National Cabinet has "the status of a cabinet meeting" at a federal level, meaning it has the same confidentiality and Freedom of Information protections as the federal cabinet, under the Freedom of Information Act 1982. However, this was later rejected in the Administrative Appeals Tribunal, which found that the body was not a Cabinet committee and was subject to ordinary freedom of information laws.

Public policy specialist Jennifer Menzies describes the National Cabinet as "COAG by another name", which has taken on a leadership role during a time of national crisis. She writes "Though called a cabinet, the national cabinet is technically an intergovernmental forum. The conventions and rules of cabinet, such as cabinet solidarity and the secrecy provisions, do not apply to the national cabinet. Its power is that which the leaders of all Australian jurisdictions bring to negotiate on behalf of their people, and to implement the decisions reached." This model has been called executive federalism.

== Current membership ==
Name	Office held	In office since	Party
Anthony Albanese	Prime Minister of Australia (Chair)	23 May 2022	Labor
Chris Minns	Premier of New South Wales	28 March 2023	Labor
Ben Carroll	(Victoria (state)) Premier of Victoria	28 July 2026	Labor
David Crisafulli	Premier of Queensland	28 October 2024	LNP
Roger Cook	Premier of Western Australia	8 June 2023	Labor
Peter Malinauskas	Premier of South Australia	21 March 2022	Labor
Jeremy Rockliff	Premier of Tasmania	8 April 2022	Liberal
Andrew Barr	Chief Minister of the Australian Capital Territory	11 December 2014	Labor
Lia Finocchiaro	Chief Minister of the Northern Territory	28 August 2024	CLP

== Former members ==
Name	Office held	Member from	Member until	Party
James Merlino	(Victoria (state)) Acting Premier of Victoria	9 March 2021	28 June 2021	Labor
Gladys Berejiklian	Premier of New South Wales	13 March 2020	5 October 2021	Liberal
Steven Marshall	Premier of South Australia	13 March 2020	21 March 2022	Liberal
Peter Gutwein	Premier of Tasmania	13 March 2020	8 April 2022	Liberal
Michael Gunner	Chief Minister of the Northern Territory	13 March 2020	13 May 2022	Labor
Scott Morrison	Prime Minister of Australia	13 March 2020	23 May 2022	Liberal
Dominic Perrottet	Premier of New South Wales	5 October 2021	28 March 2023	Liberal
Mark McGowan	Premier of Western Australia	13 March 2020	8 June 2023	Labor
Daniel Andrews	(Victoria (state)) Premier of Victoria	13 March 2020	27 September 2023	Labor
Annastacia Palaszczuk	Premier of Queensland	13 March 2020	15 December 2023	Labor
Natasha Fyles	Chief Minister of the Northern Territory	13 May 2022	21 December 2023	Labor
Eva Lawler	Chief Minister of the Northern Territory	21 December 2023	28 August 2024	Labor
Steven Miles	Premier of Queensland	15 December 2023	28 October 2024	Labor
Jacinta Allan	(Victoria (state)) Premier of Victoria	27 September 2023	28 July 2026	Labor

== Meetings and press releases ==
=== 2020 ===
- 16 March 2020: Announcement of a "significant step-up" to the pandemic, upon the advice of the AHPPC, with additional measures in order to reduce community transmission. These included banning cruise ships from docking, enhanced screening of arrivals, and mandatory self-isolation for everyone arriving in Australia. National Cabinet also activated the second stage of the Australian Health Sector Emergency Response Plan for Novel Coronavirus, which "enables governments to undertake targeted action... and ensures that resources are properly allocated where needed and the risks to vulnerable people in the community are mitigated".
- 25 March 2020: PM announces creation of the National COVID-19 Coordination Commission (NCCC), and clarifies role of various bodies: the National Cabinet "continues to lead the national response at a government level. The National Security Committee of Cabinet's COVID-19 Taskforce and the Expenditure Review Committee of Cabinet continue to take decisions that determine the Commonwealth's response to the global COVID-19 pandemic".
- 29 March 2020: National Cabinet noted that the rate of increase of the spread of COVID-19 was slowing, but overall numbers were still increasing and welcomed the new coronavirus app and WhatsApp channel released by the Government. It announced new limits to indoor and outdoor gatherings to two persons only (with some exceptions); discussed further social distancing measures; gave further advice to senior citizens; and agreed to a moratorium on evictions for the coming six months for both commercial and residential tenancies suffering financial distress.
- 4 May 2020: Jacinda Ardern, the Prime Minister of New Zealand, was invited to join the National Cabinet in a meeting on 5 May, to discuss strategies in dealing with the virus and the Australian COVIDSafe app.
- 29 May 2020: PM announces that the National Cabinet will replace COAG on a permanent basis, meeting monthly once the pandemic is over.
- 18 September 2020: National Cabinet met to discuss Australia's COVID-19 response, recent progress following the Victorian outbreak and easing restrictions (including international border measures).
- 16 October 2020: National Cabinet meeting postponed to "technical problems" with Prime Minister Morrison's plane.
- 23 October 2020: National Cabinet discussed and made announcements regarding progress following the Victorian outbreak, the budget, and made announcements on the newly-developed "Framework for National Reopening Australia by Christmas", improving quarantine systems, returning citizens, the Mental Health National Cabinet Reform Committee, Aged Care Emergency Response Centres, and the establishment of a Taskforce on Veterans’ Wellbeing.
- 13 November 2020 (31st meeting): National Cabinet discussed Australia's COVID-19 response, COVID-19 vaccination policy, the Framework for National Reopening by Christmas, helping Australians prepare to go back to work in a COVID-safe environment, getting the economy moving again, a review of contact tracing and outbreak management systems, returning Australians, international students and other matters.

=== 2021 ===
- 22 January 2021: National Cabinet convened to discuss international return limits and COVID-19 vaccines. The forum decided to remain at a reduced rate, following the introduction of the more infectious UK strain into Australia, until 15 February. National Cabinet also agreed that the COVID-19 vaccine is not currently planned to be mandatory for aged care workers, but may become so later, noting concerns from the industry that it should be mandatory.
- 4 June 2021: National Cabinet met to discuss Australia’s COVID-19 response and changes to the Australian COVID-19 Vaccine Strategy.

=== 2023 ===
- 6 December 2023: National Cabinet met to discuss reforms around gun control – implementing a National Firearms Registry triggered by the aftermath of the Wieambilla shootings, healthcare – boosting funding for Medicare Urgent Care Clinics (an election promise of the Albanese Government), the National Disability Insurance Scheme – to cap growth at 8 per cent and controlling growth, Goods and Services Tax – extending the No Worse Off Guarantee until 2027–28 to ensure states are funded equitably.

=== 2026 ===
- 26 August 2026: National Cabinet met in Sydney to discuss drafting National AI laws in 2027, firearms reform to restrict firearms licences to Australian citizens, gender based violence, Avian flu and an update on Australia's Fuel supply security.

== Succession of COAG ==
There had been suggestions for the National Cabinet to continue on a permanent basis after the pandemic is over, effectively replacing COAG. On 14 April 2020, Prime Minister Morrison was reported saying, "The processes we've established for the National Cabinet may prove to be a better way for our federal system to work in the future, but this will be a matter for another time", and Western Australian Premier Mark McGowan said no other state leaders had objected when he had brought up the idea of continuing the National Cabinet. He also told The Australian newspaper, "The National Cabinet process has removed the political boundaries that can hamper COAG".

Former Labor premier of South Australia Jay Weatherill called it a "fantastic innovation [that] should continue", adding that it had "achieved more in the last few months than many COAGs have achieved over many years".

On 29 May 2020, the Prime Minister announced that the National Cabinet would replace COAG (with COAG being abolished) and meetings after the pandemic would be held monthly, instead of the biannual meetings of COAG. According to Simon Benson of The Australian newspaper, an analogy used to describe the significance of this was "as if the United Nations had been turned into a government".

== See also ==
- Cabinet of Australia – Chief group heading the Australian government
- Council of Australian Governments – Defunct Australian subnational intergovernmental forum
- Federal Council of Australasia – Intergovernmental colonial body, 1885–1900
- National Security Committee – National security and major foreign policy body in Australia
- War Cabinet of Australia – Government committee formed to conduct a war
