= Australia.gov.au =

Directory website of the Australian Government

australia.gov.au
- Website type: Government directory
- Owner: Australian Government
- Creator: Digital Transformation Agency
- Website: australia.gov.au
- Commercial: No

Australia.gov.au was the central website for the Australian Government, providing onwards links to department and agency websites. The address redirects to my.gov.au. Australia no longer has a simple entry page to the structure of government. A complete listing of all government departments and agencies can be found at directory.gov.au. The original platform was owned and managed by the Digital Transformation Agency (DTA) on behalf of the federal government, and can also be used by federal and state and territory agencies as a link shortener.

During the COVID-19 pandemic, the Australian Government reappropriated the website as the "Coronavirus response site", moving existing content to info.Australia.gov.au for the foreseeable future. Federal health and economic response campaigns all advertised the website, which also includes links to state and territory health department websites. This site is also now not available.

== History ==
Australia.gov.au became active in September 2001. Various other Australian Government websites for departments and agencies were activated around that time, including the Australian Security Intelligence Organisation and the Royal Australian Air Force.

In March 2006, Australia.gov.au was awarded "Best Government Site" by Australian NetGuide.

The Australian Financial Review reported that efforts in 2017 to centralise all government websites Australia.gov.au, similar to gov.uk, had faded after departments resisted moves to centralise government communications.

In March 2020, following the beginning of the COVID-19 pandemic in Australia, the DTA changed Australia.gov.au to become the "central portal for citizens, companies and communities to get official information on COVID-19." On 22 March, the new "Coronavirus response site" was launched, including a symptom checker. Speaking to the Australian Financial Review, a government spokesperson said that all television, print, radio and digital campaigns related to the COVID-19 pandemic would advertise Australia.gov.au. This move was made as the government announced a range of economic and safety measures, not appropriate for the Department of Health's website. A former senior official at the DTA described that the transformation of Australia.gov.au was similar to that of New Zealand Government's COVID-19 portal.

This site no longer exists. Date of removal is unknown.

Australia.gov.au and fed.gov.au links (a previous directory of Australian Government agencies) now redirect to myGov.
