= Australian Quarantine and Inspection Service =

Biodiversity security agency in Australia

- Australian Quarantine and Inspection Service logo

Agency overview
- Dissolved: 2012
- Superseding agency: Department of Agriculture, Fisheries and Forestry
- Jurisdiction: Australia
- Headquarters: Canberra, Australian Capital Territory
- Minister responsible: Senator Joe Ludwig, Minister for Agriculture, Fisheries and Forestry
- Agency executive: Rona Mellor, Deputy Secretary Biosecurity
- Website: https://web.archive.org/web/20080925094838/http://www.aqis.gov.au:80/

The Australian Quarantine and Inspection Service was the Australian government agency responsible for enforcing Australian quarantine laws, as part of the Department of Agriculture.

Following a period operating under the name DAFF Biosecurity, it has since been absorbed into divisions in the Department of Agriculture and Water Resources.

== Quarantine in Australia ==
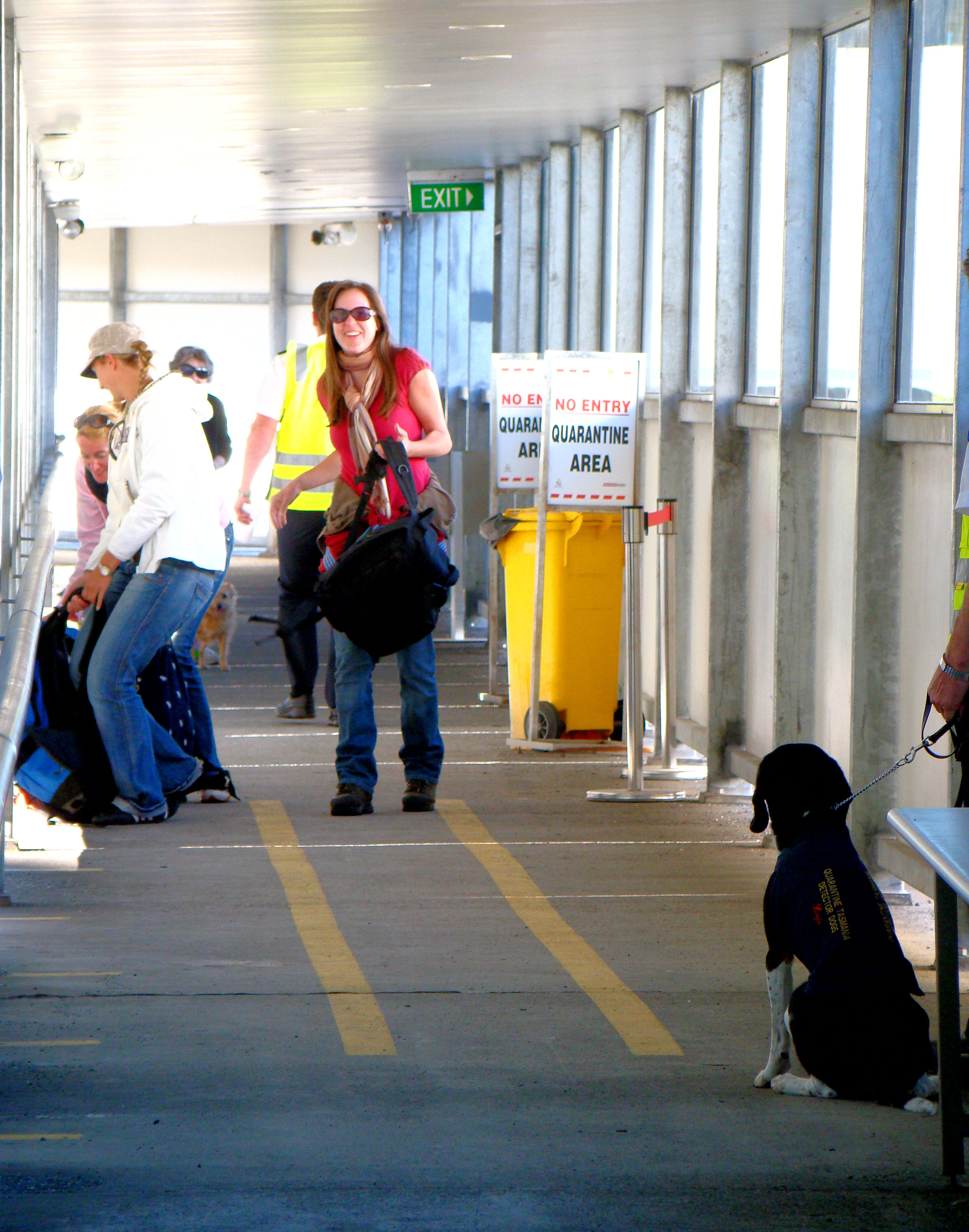
Dog at work searching for fruit in the luggage of passengers embarking from a boat to Tasmania

AQIS's import and export inspection and certification is essential to maintaining Australia's highly favourable animal, plant and human health status and access to export markets. Quarantine controls at Australia's borders minimise the risk of exotic pests and diseases to protect Australia's agriculture industries and environment. AQIS does this by specialist Federal law enforcement officers known as Quarantine & Exports Inspectors, or 'Quarantine Officers'.

== History ==
On 30 March 1908, the Commonwealth Quarantine service came into operation and took over quarantine stations in every Australian state, as allowed in section 2A of the Quarantine Act 1908. The 1956 Summer Olympics, held in Melbourne, were prevented by the quarantine regulations to host the equestrian events; therefore they were held in Stockholm, Sweden five months earlier.

== Role of AQIS ==
AQIS was the agency responsible for animal, plant and human quarantine border controls, of passengers and cargo. AQIS officers used X-ray machines and sniffer dogs in airports, seaports and mail centres to search for quarantine risk material.

Along with Food Standards Australia and New Zealand (FSANZ) AQIS administered the Imported Food Programme, ensuring that food commercially imported into Australia meets Australia's Quarantine Standards and the Food Standards Code.

AQIS also provided inspection and certification for a range of agricultural products exported from Australia, to ensure compliance with overseas countries importation requirements.

== Biosecurity Australia ==
Biosecurity Australia was a prescribed agency within the Australian Government Department of Agriculture from August 2007 to September 2009. In September 2009, a division of DAFF known as Biosecurity Services Group took over their functions. Biosecurity Australia provided policy advice to AQIS concerning the importation of quarantine risk material to Australia when requested by AQIS. Under the Quarantine Act 1908, AQIS had responsibility for setting the rules concerning the imports, not Biosecurity Australia.

== See also ==
- Australian Customs and Border Protection Service
- Biosecurity in Australia
- Department of Agriculture, Fisheries and Forestry (Australia)
- Department of Agriculture and Water Resources
