= Biosecurity Act 2015 =

Australian law

Parliament of Australia
- Long title: An Act relating to diseases and pests that may cause harm to human, animal or plant health or the environment, and for related purposes.
- Passed: 15 May 2015
- Enacted: 16 June 2015
- Royal assent: 16 June 2015

Legislative history
- Introduced: 2014

Summary
- The Biosecurity Act 2015 supersedes the Quarantine Act 1908 and manages biosecurity risks in Australia.
- Status: Current legislation

The Biosecurity Act 2015 is an Act of the Parliament of Australia which manages biosecurity risks in Australia at the national border. It was enacted on 16 June 2015, after the Bill was passed with bipartisan support on 14 May 2015. It covers both agricultural and human medical biosecurity risks, including epidemics and pandemics, and is designed to contain and/or deal with any "diseases and pests that may cause harm to human, animal or plant health or the environment" in Australia.

The application of the Act was particularly tested during the COVID-19 pandemic in Australia.

== History ==
The Act replaced most of the Quarantine Act 1908, which was wholly repealed on 16 June 2016 by the Biosecurity (Consequential Amendments and Transitional Provisions) Act 2015. The new Act is a major reform of the Quarantine Act, in particular in its strengthening and modernising the existing framework of regulations governing biosecurity legislation in Australia.

As recommended by the Beale Review (One Biosecurity: A Working Partnership, Roger Beale et al., 2008) and the earlier Nairn Report, the Act adopts a risk-based approach, but includes several measures to manage unacceptable levels of biosecurity risk. New requirements include how the Department of Agriculture, Water and the Environment (at the time of enactment, Department of Agriculture and Water Resources) would manage biosecurity risks associated with goods, people and vessels entering Australia.

The Biosecurity Bill 2014 passed through parliament on 14 May 2015 with bipartisan support. The Act did not radically change operational functions, but were more clearly described, with the aim of being easier to use and reducing the complexity of administering it. The main change relate was the compliance and enforcement of powers.

=== Amendments and related legislation ===
The Act has been amended a number of times, with the latest amended, as of 25 March 2020, being the Coronavirus Economic Response Package Omnibus Act 2020, which also affects other legislation. Also related to the Act are the Biosecurity Charges Imposition (General) Act 2015, Biosecurity Regulation 2016, Biosecurity (Human Health) Regulation 2016, and Biosecurity Charges Imposition (General) Regulation 2016.

== Description ==
The Act is about "managing diseases and pests that may cause harm to human, animal or plant health or the environment" in Australia, however, it has no jurisdiction within Australia as biosecurity is a sovereign right of the States under the Australian Constitution and is instead focused on preventing the entry of new pests and diseases and managing ‘Commonwealth land’ such as ports and defence force sites. There are chapters which cover management of risks in several areas, including:

- Risks to human health. Human diseases listed in a legislative instrument are the main focus, but there are also requirements relating to people entering or leaving Australian territory as well as rules relating to managing deceased people.
- Goods that are brought into Australian territory from outside Australian territory, by air or by sea. It also provides for prohibition of or conditions relating to certain goods from being brought or imported into Australian territory.
- Aircraft and vessels entering Australian territory from outside Australian territory, including controlling landing or mooring places and their movement while they are in Australian territory.
- Implementation of the Ballast Water Convention, which regulates the ballast water and sediment of certain vessels, in accordance with the United Nations Convention on the Law of the Sea.
- Other biosecurity risks which may be posed by diseases or pests in or on goods or premises in Australian territory.
- Arrangements to enable biosecurity officials to carry out biosecurity activities to manage biosecurity risks associated with goods, premises or other things.
- Provision for the Governor-General of Australia to declare biosecurity emergencies and human biosecurity emergencies; provision for special powers for the Agriculture Minister to deal with biosecurity emergencies (including the delegation of certain powers to national response agencies; and provision for special powers to be given to the Health Minister to deal with human biosecurity emergencies, including by effecting the recommendations of the World Health Organization (WHO).
- Provision for powers for biosecurity officers to ensure people are complying with this Act, to investigate non‑compliance and to enforce this Act by means such as civil penalties, infringement notices, enforceable undertakings and injunctions and other means.
- Governance is described, including the functions and powers of the Director of Biosecurity, Director of Human Biosecurity, and various types of biosecurity officers.

Part 3 (Section 344) states that the Director of Human Biosecurity is the person acting in the capacity of Commonwealth Chief Medical Officer (CMO), and this person has certain powers conferred upon them by this Act. Part 4 deals with human biosecurity officers. The CMO may, under Section 563 of the Act, make members of the Australian Defence Force, as well as officers and employees of the federal and state departments of health, human biosecurity officers, if satisfied that they have appropriate clinical expertise.

== Biosecurity emergencies ==
Chapter 8, Part 2 of the Act deals with "emergencies involving threats or harm to human health on a nationally significant scale". This chapter deals with special powers which exist as well as the powers available under Chapter 2. "The Governor‑General may make a human biosecurity emergency declaration if the Health Minister is satisfied that the special powers in this Part are needed to deal with a human biosecurity emergency. The Health Minister may exercise special powers under this Part to deal with a human biosecurity emergency, subject to limits and protections. These powers may be exercised anywhere in Australian territory".

Similar emergency powers are given to the Governor-General and Agriculture Minister for other types of biosecurity emergencies, in Chapter 8, Part 1. In addition, the Agriculture Minister may "declare Commonwealth bodies, or parts of Commonwealth bodies, to be national response agencies for the purposes of dealing with biosecurity emergencies", and some of the Minister's powers may be delegated to staff in the national response agencies.

=== Scope ===
An article on the parliamentary website explains the scope the Health Minister's powers under the Act under sections 477 and 478. The minister may:

• set requirements to regulate or restrict the movement of persons, goods, or conveyances

• require that places be evacuated

• make directions to close premises.

The powers are not limited to these circumstances. Under the Biosecurity Act, provided that the Minister is satisfied that an action is necessary to either combat the listed human disease (in this case, COVID-19) or to implement WHO recommendations in relation to that disease, the Minister may make a direction or set a requirement to ensure that action takes place.

However, the Minister may not impose certain biosecurity obligations on an individual, such as requiring them to undergo a medical examination, requiring body samples for diagnosis, or requiring them to receive specified treatment or medication. Such measures can only be authorised under a human biosecurity control order, made by the Commonwealth Chief Medical Officer or a biosecurity officer in relation to a person who may have a listed human disease (including COVID-19).

However, Sub-section 478(5) places limits on interference with state and territory bodies and officials: "A direction must not be given under subsection (1) to an officer or employee of a State, Territory or State or Territory body unless the direction is in accordance with an agreement between the Commonwealth and the State, Territory or body". (For the COVID-19 pandemic, an intergovernmental agreement was signed.)

== Invocations ==
=== 2020 invocation of state of emergency ===
On 18 March 2020, a human biosecurity emergency was declared in Australia owing to the risks to human health posed by the COVID-19 pandemic in Australia, after the National Security Committee met the previous day. The Act specifies that the Governor-General may declare such an emergency if the Health Minister (at the time Greg Hunt; as of April 2026 Mark Butler) is satisfied that "a listed human disease is posing a severe and immediate threat, or is causing harm, to human health on a nationally significant scale". This gives the Minister sweeping powers, including imposing restrictions or preventing the movement of people and goods between specified places, and evacuations. The Biosecurity (Human Biosecurity Emergency) (Human Coronavirus with Pandemic Potential) Declaration 2020 was declared by the Governor-General, David Hurley, under Section 475 of the Act. The Act only allows for three months, but the period may be extended for a further three if the Governor-General is satisfied that it is required.

The Biosecurity (Human Biosecurity Emergency) (Human Coronavirus with Pandemic Potential) (Emergency Requirements) Determination 2020, made by the Health Minister on the same day under Section 477 of the Act, banned international cruise ships from entering Australian ports before 15 April 2020.

On 25 March 2020, the Health Minister made a second determination, the Biosecurity (Human Biosecurity Emergency) (Human Coronavirus with Pandemic Potential) (Overseas Travel Ban Emergency Requirements) Determination 2020, which "forbids Australian citizens and permanent residents from leaving Australian territory by air or sea as a passenger".

On 25 April 2020, the Biosecurity (Human Biosecurity Emergency) (Human Coronavirus with Pandemic Potential) (Emergency Requirements—Public Health Contact Information) Determination 2020, made under subsection 477(1) of the Act, was signed into law by the Health Minister. The purpose of the new legislation is "to make contact tracing faster and more effective by encouraging public acceptance and uptake of COVIDSafe", COVIDSafe being the new mobile app created for the purpose. The function of the app is to record contact between any two people who both have the app on their phones when they come within 1.5 metres (4 ft 11 in) of each other. The encrypted data would remain on the phone for 21 days of not encountering a person logged with confirmed COVID-19.

==== Investigation into breach by Ruby Princess ====
On 5 April 2020, New South Wales Police launched a criminal investigation into whether the operator of Ruby Princess, Carnival Australia, broke the Biosecurity Act 2015 (Cwth) and possibly NSW state laws, by deliberately concealing COVID-19 cases.

=== 2021 India flight ban ===
Late on 30 April 2021, after some days earlier imposing a ban on all flights from India, which was experiencing a dramatic rise in cases in a second wave of the COVID-19 pandemic, the Federal Government announced a ban on Australian citizens and permanent residents in India from entering Australia via any route. These measures came into effect on 3 May and would remain in force until 15 May. Prime Minister Scott Morrison announced that anyone, including Australian citizens and permanent residents, caught returning from India to Australia via any route would be subject to punishment under the Biosecurity Act, with penalties for breaches including up to five years' jail, a fine of A$66,600, or both. Foreign Minister Marise Payne reported that 57% of positive cases in quarantine had come from India in April, compared with 10% in March. The move was branded as racist by some critics, and a potential breach of international human rights law. On 3 May 2021 the government announced that it would review this decision earlier than originally intended, possibly within the same week. There were about 9,000 Australian citizens in India, of whom 650 were considered vulnerable.

On 7 May 2021 Morrison announced that the flight ban would end on 15 May and that repatriation flights to the Northern Territory would start on this date. A legal challenge to the ban was due to be heard in the Federal Court in Sydney on 12 May 2021, part of the challenge was rejected on 10 May.

== See also ==
- Biosecurity in Australia
