= Coronavirus Australia =

Australian COVID-19 app

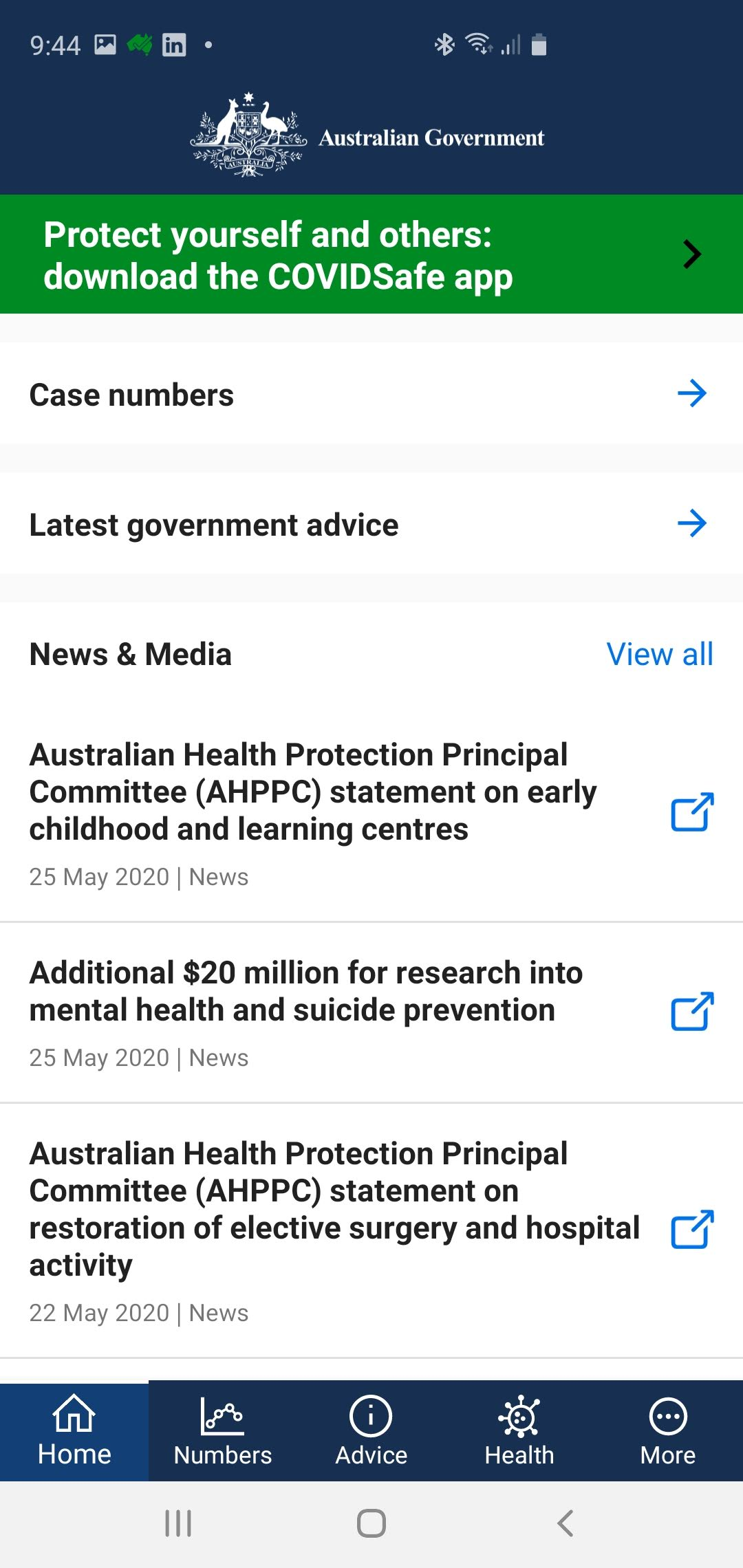
- Screenshot
- Developers: Delv Pty Ltd; Digital Transformation Agency
- Release: 29 March 2020; 6 years ago
- Final release: 1.1 / 28 May 2020; 6 years ago
- Written in: Kotlin (Android); Swift (iOS)
- Operating system: Android, iOS
- Size: 7.1 MB (Android); 23.6 MB (iOS)
- Available in: English
- Licence: Proprietary software
- Website: www.health.gov.au/resources/apps-and-tools/coronavirus-australia-app

Coronavirus Australia was an app released by the Australian Government designed to allow users to access information about the COVID-19 pandemic in Australia. The app was released by the Department of Health on 29 March 2020, and decommissioned two years later on 31 August 2022. Over its lifetime, the app was downloaded over a million times and was initially ranked first in the Apple App Store's "Health and Fitness" category. Due to the short development period of two weeks, the app initially served primarily as an aggregate of links to official government websites. Shortly after an update was released adding a voluntary "isolation registration" form that collected the location, name, age, mobile phone number, isolation start date, and various other details about users who were self isolating.

On 14 April 2020 a separate contact tracing app, COVIDSafe, was announced based on Singapore's TraceTogether app and BlueTrace protocol.

== Development ==
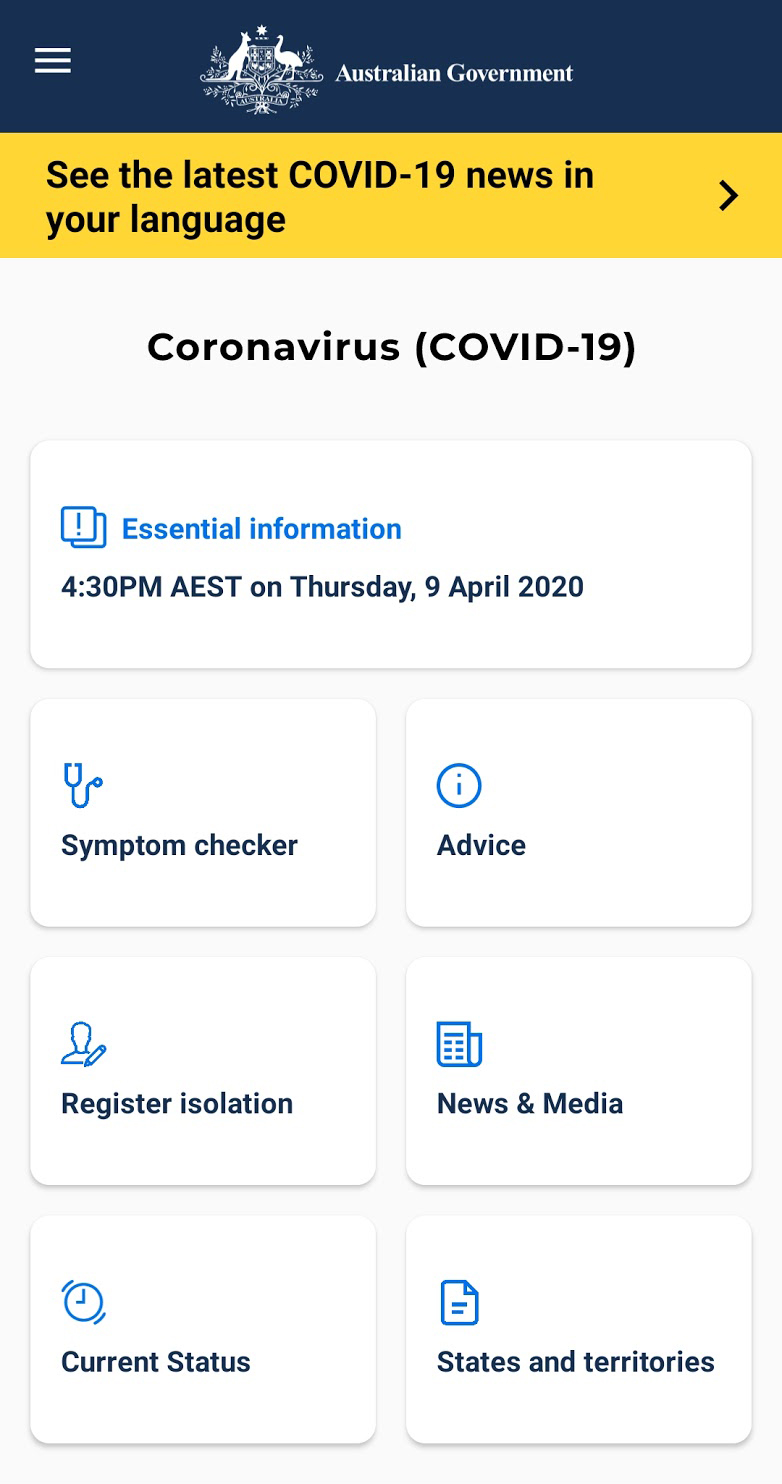
A screenshot of Coronavirus Australia prior to its 28 May redesign

The app was developed by recruitment house Delv Pty Ltd over a period of two weeks. Delv was hired by the Digital Transformation Agency for A$1.85 million, and the Department of Health for A$1.438 million, totaling over A$3 million. The app launched on 29 March 2020, three days after it was first announced publicly. Although initially rumoured to have similar functions to Singapore's open-source TraceTogether app, it did not have such features at release. The day after launch an update was released adding a voluntary isolation registration form, and a web version was released to accompany it.

Later, on 9 April 2020, another update was released adding an "essential information" tab and link to various translations of SBS news. The essential information tab added dot points summarising information about the coronavirus.

The 28 May 2020 release completely overhauled the user interface, moving from a card based interface with a navigation drawer, to a tab and folder based one. With the replacement of the drawer with tabs on Android, the two apps gained a consistent navigation model. A news feed showing the latest news items has been moved to the home screen, with many of the cards that were previously present there moved to the tab bar or nested within a folder. Additionally, a custom content management system has been introduced, allowing for the embedding of native articles and content. The release on 9 July 2020 introduced a COVID-19 clinic finder and restriction checker. The clinic finder was built on top of the Australian Government's existing HealthDirect API, in contrast to the rest of the app which uses Firebase Firestore and Remote Config to fetch dynamic content.

On 30 September 2020, the contract for the development of the Coronavirus Australia app concluded, effectively ending major development of the app.

Version history
| Version | Release date | Features |
|---|---|---|
| 1.0.0 | 29 March 2020 | Initial release |
| 1.0.1 | 30 March 2020 | Added the "register isolation" form |
| 1.0.2 | 9 April 2020 | Added the "essential information" tab and the SBS news banner |
| 1.0.4 | 23 April 2020 | Added video content |
| 1.1 | 28 May 2020 | UI overhaul and consistency improvements between Android & iOS |
| 1.4 | 9 July 2020 | Introduction of clinic finder and restrictions checker |
| 1.4.9 | 22 October 2020 | Minor changes to notifications to improve reliable delivery. Offline mode fixed in Android versions - now displays content when device is not connected to the internet. Cumulative graph added to Numbers screen. |
| 1.4.10 | 21 January 2021 | Replaces the display of 'Recovered' cases with 'Active cases' to keep the numbers consistent with data released by Department of Health. |
