= Digital Transformation Agency =

Government digital services agency of the Australian Government

Coordinates: 35.2772293°S 149.1223719°E

Agency overview
- Formed: 14 October 2016; 9 years ago
- Preceding agency: Digital Transformation Office
- Jurisdiction: Australian Government
- Headquarters: Canberra, Australian Capital Territory
- Employees: 214 (at 30 June 2022)
- Annual budget: AUD$76.24 million (2022–23)
- Minister responsible: Katy Gallagher, Minister for Finance, Minister for Women and Minister for the Public Service
- Agency executive: Chris Fechner, Chief Executive Officer
- Parent department: Department of Finance
- Website: dta.gov.au

The Digital Transformation Agency (DTA) is an executive agency within the Australian Government’s finance portfolio which supports the digital transformation of government services. Since 1 July 2022 it has done this by:

- providing strategic leadership on whole-of-government and shared digital services (including sourcing and capability development)
- delivering policies, standards and platforms for whole-of-government and shared digital service delivery
- providing advice to agencies and the government on digital investment proposals
- overseeing significant digital investments, assurance policy and framework, and the whole-of-government digital portfolio.

== Commonwealth Digital and ICT Investment Oversight Framework ==
In overseeing the Australian Government’s large digital investment portfolio, the DTA operates under the Commonwealth Digital and ICT Investment Oversight Framework. The six states of this Investment Oversight Framework enable the effective management of the Commonwealth’s digital investments across the project lifecycle.

- Strategic planning – advising, implementing and evaluating the government’s digital strategic direction to ensure the best possible digital services and outcomes.
- Prioritisation – prioritising, planning and advising on the short, medium and longer-term pipeline of government agency digital investments proposals.
- Contestability – making sure investment proposals considered by Cabinet are robust, meet required standards and align with relevant government digital policies.
- Assurance – providing assurance to government that funded digital projects are on track to deliver expected benefits.
- Digital sourcing – delivering value-for-money arrangements to simplify government procurement of digital products (including single-seller arrangements, panels/marketplaces and BuyICT.gov.au).
- Operation – regularly collecting data on digital projects, as well as digital business-as-usual arrangements to garner information on the size, health and maturity of the government’s investment portfolio (including emerging technology, reuse and shared capabilities, and workforce considerations).

The Australian Government Architecture – a key part of the Investment Oversight Framework – consists of strategies, policies, standards and designs that encourage standardisation, reuse of technologies and platforms, and effective design of, and investment, in modern digital capabilities across government.

== History ==
The DTA’s predecessor is the Digital Transformation Office, which was formed on 23 January 2015. The Office was in charge of digitising and managing various government services. It was primarily responsible for managing the myGov website and app. On 14 October 2016, it was renamed the Digital Transformation Agency.

The DTA has been an integral influencer in shaping several different whole-of-government platforms, including:

- myGov
- Coronavirus Australia
- COVIDSafe
- australia.gov.au
