= COVID-19 pandemic in Australia =

- Disease: COVID-19
- Pathogen: SARS-CoV-2
- Location: Australia
- First outbreak: Wuhan, Hubei, China
- Index case: Melbourne, Victoria
- Arrival date: 25 January 2020 (6 years, 9 months and 4 weeks)
- Date: As of 12 January 2023
- Confirmed cases: 11,861,161
- Active cases: 79,112 (estimated)
- Hospitalised cases: 5,025
- Critical cases: 419
- Ventilator cases: 117
- Recovered: 10,541,594 (estimated)
- Deaths: 19,265
- Fatality rate: 0.15%
- Test positivity rate: 21.75% (7-day average)
- Vaccinations: 22,231,734 (total vaccinated); 21,647,524 (fully vaccinated); 69,686,750 (doses administered)

Government website
- www.health.gov.au/covid-19

The COVID-19 pandemic in Australia was part of the worldwide pandemic of the coronavirus disease 2019 (COVID-19) caused by severe acute respiratory syndrome coronavirus 2 (SARS-CoV-2). The first confirmed case in Australia was identified on 25 January 2020, in Victoria, when a man who had returned from Wuhan, Hubei Province, China, tested positive for the virus. By 6 August 2022, Australia had reported over 11,350,000 cases and 19,265 deaths, with Victoria's 2020 second wave having the highest fatality rate per case.

In March 2020, the Australian government established the intergovernmental National Cabinet and declared a human biosecurity emergency in response to the outbreak. Australian borders were closed to all non-residents on 20 March, and returning residents were required to spend two weeks in supervised quarantine hotels from 27 March. Many individual states and territories also closed their borders to varying degrees, with some remaining closed until late 2020, and continuing to periodically close during localised outbreaks. Social distancing rules were introduced on 21 March, and state governments started to close "non-essential" services. "Non-essential services" included social gathering venues such as pubs and clubs but unlike many other countries did not include most business operations such as construction, manufacturing and many retail categories. The number of new cases initially grew sharply, then levelled out at about 350 per day around 22 March, and started falling at the beginning of April to under 20 cases per day by the end of the month.

Australia was one of few countries to pursue a zero-COVID "suppression" strategy until late 2021, meaning it aimed to minimise domestic community transmission. Implementation involved strict controls on international arrivals and aggressively responding to local outbreaks with lockdowns and exhaustive contact tracing of domestic COVID-19 clusters. A second wave of infections emerged in Victoria during May and June 2020, which was attributed to an outbreak at a Melbourne quarantine hotel. The second wave, though largely localised to Melbourne, was much more widespread and deadlier than the first; at its peak, the state had over 7,000 active cases. Victoria underwent a second strict lockdown which eventually lasted almost four months. The wave ended with zero new cases being recorded on 26 October 2020. No deaths from COVID-19 were recorded in Australia from 28 December 2020 until 13 April 2021, when one death occurred in Queensland.

The nationwide vaccination program began with the first doses of the Pfizer–BioNTech COVID-19 vaccine being administered in Sydney on 21 February 2021. The country's vaccine rollout, which fell short of its initial targets and was described as slow, was criticised. Further cluster outbreaks occurred in late 2020 and mid-2021, with several brief "snap lockdowns" announced in certain states to contain their spread, particularly as novel variants of SARS-CoV-2 arrived in Australia.

In July 2021, the Australian government after continually stating COVID-zero was not sustainable, published the 'National Plan' to live with COVID. As outbreaks of SARS-CoV-2 Delta variant which started in June 2021 in New South Wales spread, almost half of Australia's population and most major cities were in lockdown for at least 3 days during July 2021. The outbreak worsened in New South Wales and spread to Victoria in the following weeks causing new record daily cases in both stated later in 2021. Lockdowns were phased out after 70% of the population was vaccinated in October with most public health restrictions removed after vaccinating 90% of its population in December 2021, as the SARS-CoV-2 Omicron variant drove further records of infections. International travel began to resume in November 2021 and returned to normal in early 2022.

The government declared the emergency response "finished" in September 2022 and removed all restrictions including the requirement to isolate if one was infected from 14 October 2022. On 20 October 2023, the Australian Chief Medical Officer declared that COVID-19 was no longer a Communicable Disease Incident of National Significance (CDINS) and ended all national emergency response and coordination, shifting COVID-19 management to a more general infectious disease framework.

== Background ==
A novel coronavirus that caused a respiratory illness was identified in Wuhan, Hubei, China, in December 2019, and was reported to the World Health Organization (WHO) on 31 December 2019, which confirmed its concern on 12 January 2020. WHO declared the outbreak a Public health emergency of international concern on 30 January, and a pandemic on 11 March.

The case fatality rate of COVID-19 is much lower than that of SARS, a related disease which emerged in 2002, but its transmission has been significantly greater, leading to a much greater total death toll.

The widespread reporting of the bushfire season in major media and social media around the world caused a significant drop in the number of tourists coming to Australia, including those from China. The absence of tourist arrivals during this time could have played a significant role in sparing Australia from the spread of COVID-19 in the early stages of the pandemic. This is in contrast to other major cities in Europe and North America, where the early spread of the virus continued undetected until late February 2020 or early March 2020.

== Timeline ==
Cases

Deaths

On 23 January 2020, biosecurity officials began screening arrivals on flights from Wuhan to Sydney. Two days later the first case of a SARS-CoV-2 infection was reported, that of a Chinese citizen who arrived from Guangzhou on 19 January. The patient was tested and received treatment in Melbourne. On the same day, three other patients tested positive in Sydney after returning from Wuhan.

=== First wave: March–April 2020 ===
Australia reported its 100th case on 10 March 2020 roughly corresponding to the start of Australia's first wave. Case numbers and deaths continued to climb during March and April, but by late April the first wave had effectively ended. On 6 June, both New South Wales and Victoria reported no new cases for the previous 24 hours, with only Queensland and Western Australia reporting one new (international) case each, the lowest national total since February.

=== Second wave: June–October 2020 ===
On 20 June, the Victorian Government announced the re-tightening of restrictions on household gatherings following a spike in community transmitted cases over the previous week, reported to be mainly caused by family-to-family transmission in large household gatherings. Most easing of restrictions that were to take place were postponed. The same day restrictions were re-tightened in Victoria, the Western Australian Government announced the state would move into "Phase 4" from 27 June, permitting some of the most relaxed restrictions in the country.

On 26 October, the "second wave" ended when Victoria recorded zero new cases and zero deaths statewide for the first time since 9 June. On the same day, Daniel Andrews announced a significant easing of restrictions to take effect over the coming weeks. From 11.59 pm on 27 October, people no longer required a reason to leave home, all retail, restaurants, hotels, cafes and bars were allowed to open with capacity limits, beauty, personal services and tattooing were allowed to reopen, outdoor community sport for under 18 and outdoor non-contact sport for adults recommenced, a maximum of 10 people were allowed to attend weddings, a maximum of 20 mourners were allowed to attend funerals, and faith and religious gatherings were allowed to resume, subject to patron limitations. With a length of 112 days, this Victorian COVID-19 lockdown was the longest continuous lockdown world-wide, as of October 2020.

=== Third wave: June 2021 – October 2021 ===
Victoria recorded no deaths between late October 2020 and August 2021. New South Wales recorded their first death of the 2021 wave on 10 July 2021.

On 18 June in NSW, a SARS-CoV-2 Delta variant COVID-19 cluster in Sydney's Eastern Suburbs had grown to 4 cases. On 25 June in NSW, after 22 new cases of the Delta variant brought infections linked to the Bondi cluster to 65 total, an initial lockdown was announced for four Sydney local government areas (LGAs).

New South Wales recorded its "worst day" of its continuing June 2021 outbreak of the COVID-19 Delta variant on 29 August 2021, with six deaths, and a record 1,218 new local confirmed cases. Whilst the daily number of cases continues to increase, at the time this was the highest daily confirmed case total Australia had received on a single day, surpassing Victoria's record in the previous wave. However, the recorded COVID-19 deaths is significantly lower than the 41 daily deaths recorded in Victoria during its peak.

On 30 August in NSW, the Ministry of Health reported four deaths in the previous 24 hours of people confirmed to have had COVID-19. One of them, a man in his 50s who died at Dubbo Hospital, is believed to be the first Aboriginal or Torres Strait Islander COVID-19 related death. He was not vaccinated. The total number of COVID related deaths in NSW reached 149 since the beginning of the pandemic, and 93 during the NSW Delta outbreak. The official national death toll broke 1,000 at 1,002.

On 31 August in Victoria, the deaths of two women were reported, the first COVID deaths in that state since 30 November 2020, which ended a nine-month streak with no fatalities.

On 3 October 2021, Melbourne surpassed Buenos Aires as the city with the most cumulative days spent in lockdown in the entire world, having spent 245 days in lockdown since the start of the pandemic. The sixth lockdown ended in Melbourne at midnight on 21 October 2021 after a record 262 cumulative days throughout the pandemic. The lockdown in Sydney ended on 11 October 2021 after 106 days, following the initial Delta variant outbreak.

Australia began to re-open to the world from 1 November 2021, with vaccinated Australian citizens and permanent residents allowed to enter NSW and Victoria without being restricted by strict flight cap numbers or long hotel quarantine stays from that date.

On 8 November, Queensland premier Annastacia Palaszczuk announced that as of 17 December, all eligible unvaccinated citizens over the age of 16 would be banned from pubs, clubs, cafes, restaurants, cinemas, theatres, music festivals and stadiums, government-owned galleries, museums and libraries, and they would not be allowed to visit hospitals, aged care facilities, prisons or disability services, among other restrictions. The premier described this as "a reward for the fully vaccinated and a precaution for when the borders open", and stated that restrictions were expected to continue into 2022.

=== Omicron wave: November 2021 – February 2022 ===
On 28 November 2021, NSW Health confirmed that two returned travellers had tested positive for the new Omicron COVID-19 variant in Sydney, making them the first known cases of the strain in Australia. On 29 November, a positive case of the Omicron variant was recorded at the Howard Springs quarantine facility, from a return traveller who arrived at Darwin on 25 November from Johannesburg, South Africa. The same day, two passengers who had flown to Sydney from southern Africa via Singapore also tested positive for the Omicron variant.

On 30 November, a positive case of the Omicron variant was recorded in Sydney. The person had visited southern Africa before arriving in Sydney prior to travel restrictions, and was subsequently active in the community in Sydney and the Central Coast.

On 3 December, a positive Omicron variant case was confirmed in the ACT.

Most public health restrictions were lifted in December 2021, after 90% of the Australian population were vaccinated. The SARS-CoV-2 Omicron variant drove a record rise in infections, leading to New South Wales to have one of the highest infection rates worldwide.

=== 2022 ===
On 18 January 2022, 77 COVID-19 deaths were reported in Australia, the highest number to that point far, though not all had occurred on the same day (17 January). There were 36 in New South Wales, 22 in Victoria, 16 in Queensland, 2 in South Australia, and 1 in the Australian Capital Territory.

On 22 January 2022, Australia exceeded 3,000 deaths related to COVID-19 since the beginning of the pandemic.

By 4 February 2022, 4,000 COVID-19 related deaths were exceeded. This increased to 5,000 by 23 February.

On 21 February 2022, border restrictions were removed for all vaccinated people, including non-citizens such as tourists and new immigrants, effectively opening Australia up to the world. On 18 April 2022 further restrictions on international travel that had been imposed under the Biosecurity Act were removed, allowing cruise ships to operate in Australia for the first time in over 2 years (although only in states where the state government was willing to allow cruise ships, such as NSW, Queensland and Victoria).

In May, the requirement to wear a mask in the airport was removed.

The surge in deaths in Australia in 2022 was falsely attributed on social media to side effects from COVID-19 vaccines. The surge was actually caused by the COVID-19 pandemic itself after border and travel restrictions were lifted.

On 9 September 2022, a host of restrictions were removed. This included the requirement to wear masks on aircraft, in Western Australia the requirement to wear masks on passenger transport was removed as well. The COVID-19 mandatory isolation period was also reduced to 5 days

On 21 September 2022, South Australia, New South Wales, Queensland ended the mask mandate on passenger transport

On 22 September 2022, Victoria ended the mask mandate on passenger transport.

On 14 October 2022, the mandatory COVID-19 isolation period was scrapped entirely and replaced with recommendations.

Public Health Emergencies, Pandemic declarations and States of Emergencies were ended in each states over the following month with Victoria on 13 October, Queensland on 1 November, Western Australia on 4 November, Northern Territory on 11 November, South Australia on 23 November, New South Wales on 30 November and the Australian Capital Territory on 28 February 2023.

=== Post pandemic ===
On 23 June 2023, Queensland ended the COVID-19 traffic light advice as the disease became managed in-line with other viral diseases.

== Statistics ==
=== Clusters ===
The largest cluster in Australia from the start of the pandemic until 5 November 2021, when Australia reached its 80 percent vaccination target and entered the consolidation phase of its COVID-19 transition plan, was the Flemington/North Melbourne public housing cluster with 310 cases. The deadliest cluster in Australia was at St Basil's Homes for the Aged in Victoria, where 45 residents died.

== Responses ==
Australia pursued a zero-COVID strategy until late 2021; the stated goal of the National Cabinet was "suppression", meaning continually trying to drive community transmission to zero but expecting that new outbreaks may occur. This was in contrast to the mitigation strategies implemented by most other nations. Compared to other Western countries, notably the United States and European countries, Australia's handling has been commended for its effectiveness, but has been criticised by some for its curbing of civil liberties. Distinctive aspects of that response included early interventions to reduce reflected transmission from countries other than China during late January and February 2020; early recruitment of a large contact tracing workforce; comparatively high public trust in government responses to the pandemic, at least compared to the US and later on, the use of short, intense lockdowns to facilitate exhaustive contact tracing of new outbreaks. Australia's international borders have also remained largely closed, with limited numbers of arrivals strictly controlled, for the duration of the pandemic. Australia sought to develop a Bluetooth-based contact tracing app that does not use the privacy-preserving Exposure Notification framework supported natively by Android and Apple smartphones, and while these efforts were not particularly effective, QR code-based contact tracing apps became ubiquitous in Australia's businesses. These apps, which are effectively required by State Governments, give government health departments the ability to reconstruct the presence and possible contacts of anyone carrying a mobile telephone handset that was capable of checking-in using a QR code at the time of visiting shops, bars, restaurants or similar venues, generally for 28 days after the visit. Furthermore, venues are required to provide alternative contact registration for anyone unable to use the app.

=== Travel restrictions ===
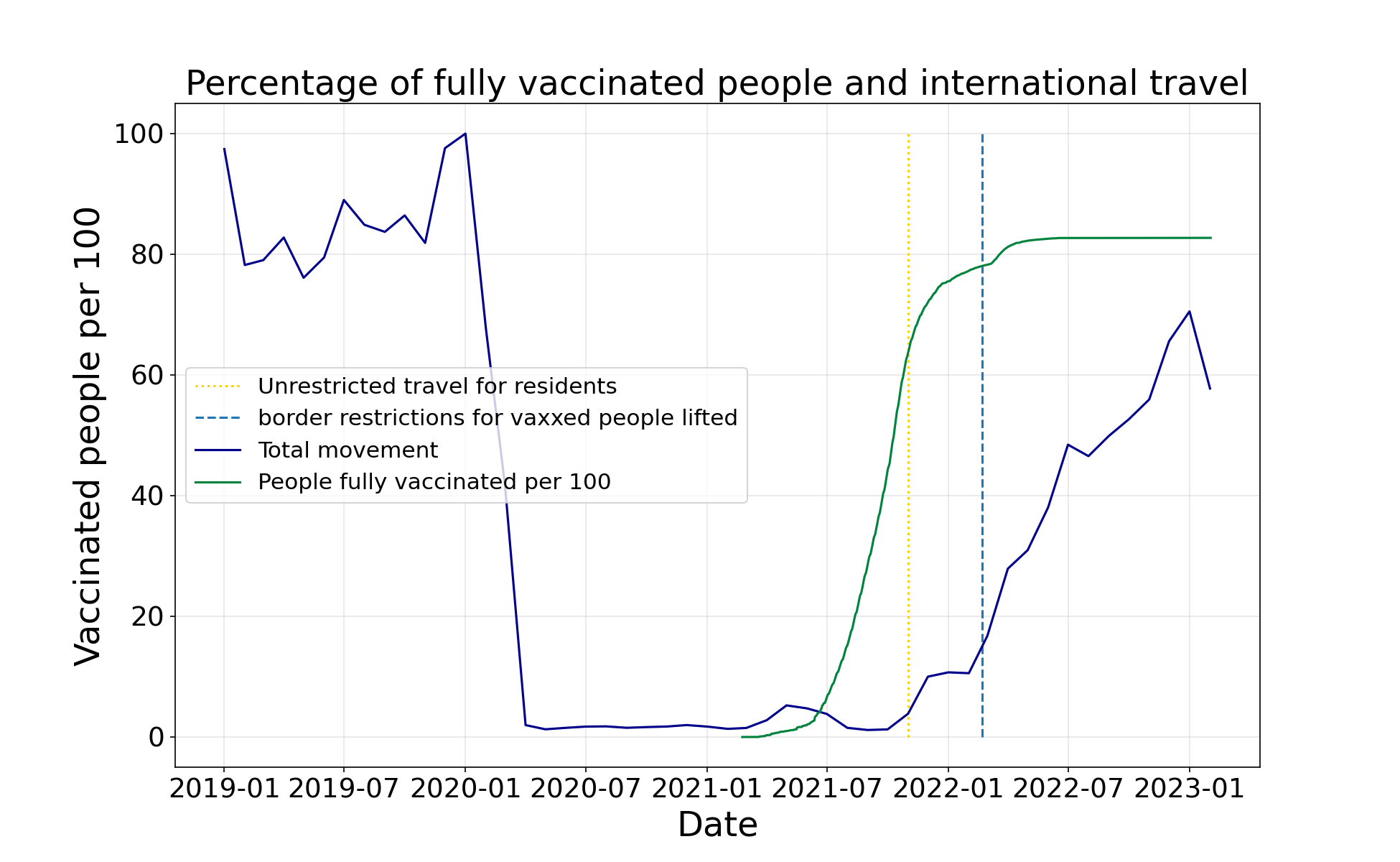
Percentage of fully vaccinated people and international travel during COVID-19.

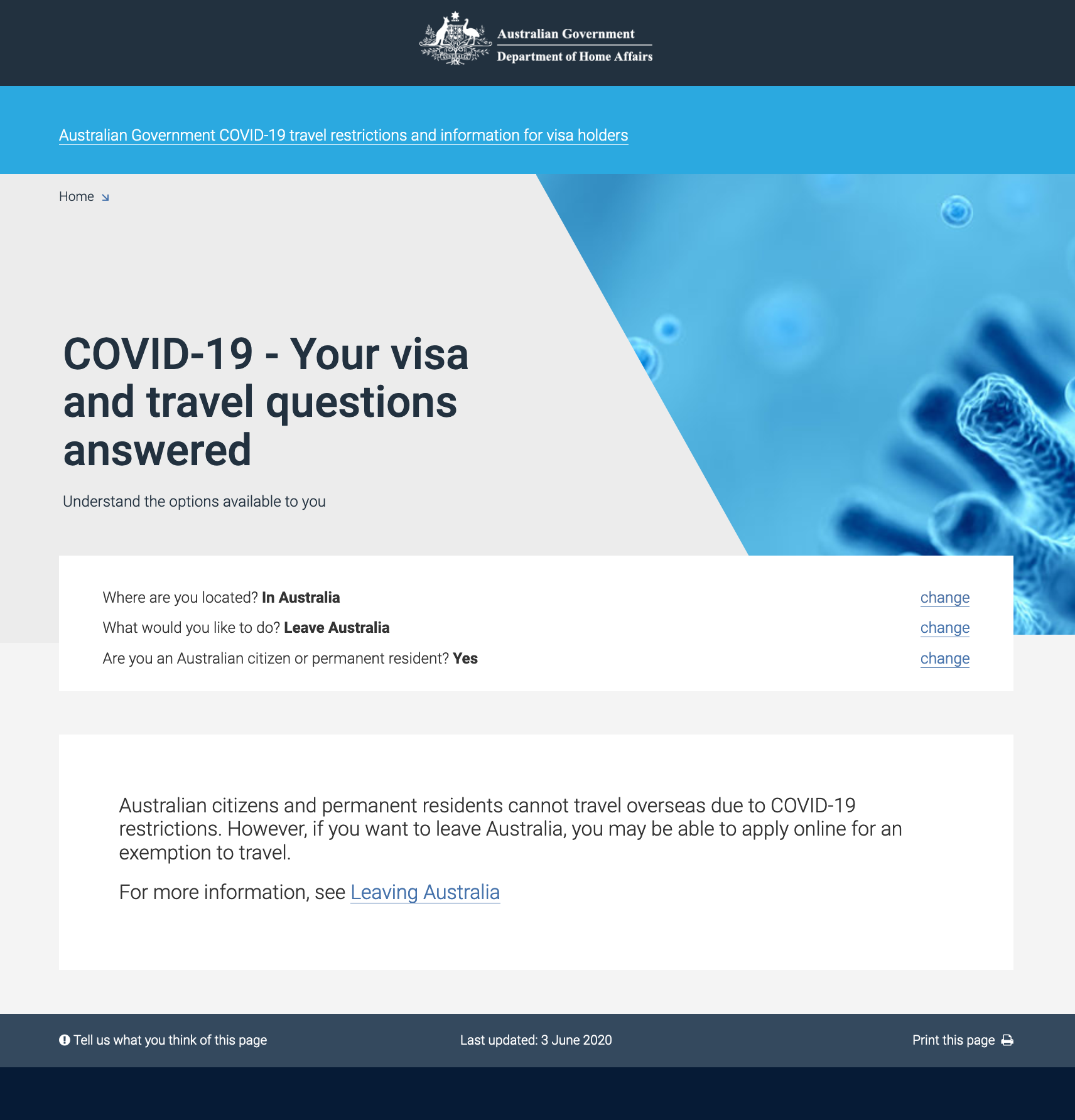
COVID-19 travel restrictions for Australians and permanent residents

==== 2020 ====
On 1 February 2020, Australia banned the entry of foreign nationals who had been in mainland China, and ordered its own returning citizens who had been in China to self-quarantine for 14 days. The country also began to assess the relative risk of reflected transmission through third countries, and to ask travelers arriving from higher-risk countries to monitor for symptoms. Australia subsequently imposed bans on Iran (1 March), South Korea (5 March), and Italy (11 March). From 16 March, all travellers arriving in or returning to Australia were required to self-isolate for 14 days. Failure to self-isolate could result in a fine of A$11,000 to A$50,000 and a possible prison sentence, depending on the state. Cruise ships were also barred from docking in the country for 30 days.

On 20 March, Australia closed its borders to all non-residents and non-Australian citizens. With limited exceptions, a ban was imposed on Australians travelling overseas.

By late March 2020, 62% of Australia's more than 3,000 coronavirus cases were among people who had returned from overseas. From then, Australians returning from overseas were subject to two weeks compulsory quarantine in hotels. The New South Wales quarantine program was helped by 150 Australian Defence Force personnel, including 30 who were stationed at hotels. In Victoria, three private security operators were contracted to provide the security, while the other states and territories used their police resources. The states and territories carried the costs of hotel quarantine. By 19 June, since the policy came into force 81,000 people had entered Australia. Of those, 63,000 had undergone hotel quarantine, while the rest, including flight crews, international businesspeople and defence members, fell under different rules. Hotel quarantine had cost $118 million as at 19 June.

Interstate border closures began on 19 March, with Tasmania imposing a mandatory 14-day quarantine on all "non-essential" travellers to the state, including returning residents. On 24 March, Western Australia, South Australia and the Northern Territory closed their borders, with all interstate arrivals being required to self-isolate for 14 days. On 11 April, Queensland banned interstate arrivals, with only Queensland residents and those granted 'exemption' being allowed entry. On 8 July, the Victorian and NSW governments, jointly closed their common border, following a large spike in cases in parts of Melbourne.

With the spike in coronavirus infections in Victoria linked to the hotel quarantine program, a judicial inquiry into the program in Victoria was called on 2 July; and all international arrivals into Melbourne were suspended. On 9 July, other state and territory leaders agreed to reduce flights and arrivals into Australia from 8,000 to 4,000 a week to ease the burden on the hotel quarantine system. States started to charge travellers for hotel quarantine. In mid-September, the states agreed to increase the number of arrivals to 6,000 a week, to help in the repatriation of tens of thousands of Australians stranded overseas. By 15 December 2020, 39,000 Australians were registered with the government as stranded, with more unregistered (as the government advised registration only for those needing assistance to return). After repeated flight cancellations and without access to government-provided health care or welfare benefits, many families reported being forced to overstay visas, and burn down savings and incur debt to pay for accommodations. Having to pay thousands of dollars for return tickets and mandatory hotel quarantine, some chose to send one family member back to resume work and earn enough money to pay the way of the rest. Between 13 March and 15 July 2020, more than 357,000 people returned to Australia. As of 15 January 2021 over 37,000 Australians were stranded abroad. On 29 January 2021, the ability of Australians stuck overseas to return was further hampered when the UK banned direct flights from the United Arab Emirates (UAE) over the possible spread of the South African COVID-19 variant. Both Etihad Airways and Emirates airlines are UAE-based.

An overnight curfew was introduced in Victoria on 2 August 2020, extended on 13 September and suspended on 27 September. A Supreme Court judge has ruled the curfew was legal.

==== 2021 ====
On 25 January 2021, Health Minister Greg Hunt suspended Australia's travel bubble with New Zealand for a period of 72 hours after New Zealand authorities confirmed a community transmission case in the country's Northland Region. On 28 January the suspension of the travel bubble was extended for 3 more days.

On 5 February 2021, National Cabinet decided to increase the number of international passenger arrivals to Australia as from mid-February. New South Wales returned to a weekly cap of 3,010 people and Queensland to 1,000. South Australia increased by 40 people a week to 530, and Victoria by almost 200 to 1,310. Western Australia remained at a reduced arrival cap. The total national weekly cap of 4,100 increased to approximately 6,300.

On 11 February 2021, the airline Cathay Pacific decided that, excepting Sydney, from 20 February it would cease all flights to Australia until the end of the month. This was in response to the Hong Kong government's new COVID rules requiring Hong Kong based aircrew to quarantine for 14 days on return to HK.

On 24 February, Queensland, New South Wales and Victoria suspended their travel bubble arrangements with New Zealand in response to a recent community outbreak in South Auckland. As a result, New Zealanders traveling to these states would have to enter quarantine.

On 2 March 2021, the general closure of Australia's international borders to travel was extended another three months to 17 June 2021. Australia's borders had now already been closed for 12 months. The border could reopen earlier if the closure was "no longer needed". Despite the border closure, between 25 March and 31 December 2020 over 105,000 exemptions were approved for people to leave Australia.

By April 2021, there were still about 40,000 Australians stranded overseas by the high cost of plane tickets and the cap on the number of people in the quarantine system, which was criticised for special treatment of sportspeople and celebrities. Australia was chastised by the United Nations Human Rights Committee, which requested a prompt return for the country's citizens; the government has given out A$29 million to about 3,900 stranded people as a last resort, and operated 28 repatriation flights.

On 23 April, Prime Minister Morrison announced that travellers to Australia from "high risk" countries, in particular India, were to be reduced by 30 per cent. This decision was based on an increase in positive results for COVID-19 among travellers from India at the Howard Springs, Northern Territory quarantine facility. Travel to such countries was also to be limited.

In general, the border restrictions had had broad public support, though critics suggested safety could be improved by constructing more outdoor quarantine centres rather than relying on urban hotels, which had suffered 16 leaks to the surrounding communities as of April 2021, out of about half a million quarantined. The government did not have an ordered queue of returnees; outside of repatriation flights, the order in which people returned was determined by commercial airlines, resulting in Australian citizens making up fewer than half of incoming travellers in February 2021.

On 27 April, due to the "record-breaking" outbreak of COVID-19 in India, with 323,000 new infections that day after five days with new cases peaking above 350,000, and another 2,771 COVID deaths there, the Federal Government "paused" all incoming flights from India until at least 15 May. The pause includes repatriation flights into the Howard Springs quarantine facility near Darwin with more than 9,000 Australians in India at this date wanting to come to Australia.

Late on 30 April, the Federal Government announced a ban on Australian citizens and permanent residents in India from entering Australia via any route. These measures came into effect on 3 May and would remain in force until 15 May. Breaches would be subject to punishment under the Biosecurity Act 2015, with penalties for breaches including up to five years' jail, a fine of A$66,600,or both. Foreign Minister Marise Payne reported that 57% of positive cases in quarantine had come from India in April, compared with 10% in March. Unlike the prior travel bans imposed in 2020 on Iran, South Korea and Italy, and the interstate travel bans regularly imposed as outbreaks occur, the move was branded as racist by some critics, and a potential breach of international human rights law. On 3 May 2021 the government announced that it would review this decision earlier than originally intended, possibly within the same week. There were about 9,000 Australian citizens in India, of whom 650 were considered vulnerable.

On 26 June 2021 at 8:30 pm (AEST), due to multiple outbreaks across Australia of the SARS-CoV-2 Delta variant, New Zealand immediately paused trans-Tasman travel with Australia until 10 pm (AEST) on 30 June.

On 2 July, National Cabinet decided that from 14 July, the number of airline passengers allowed into Australia would be capped at 3,035, half what it was before. The Victorian, Western Australian and Queensland governments had been advocating a large decrease in incoming passenger numbers because of the highly infectious nature of the Delta COVID strain. More repatriation flights to the Howard Springs quarantine facility were to be organised in response.

The states would receive passengers thus:

- Sydney: 1,505
- Perth: 265
- Adelaide: 265
- Melbourne: 500
- Brisbane: 500 (additional 150 surge capacity)

On 1 November, Australia began to re-open to the world, with vaccinated Australian citizens and permanent residents allowed to enter NSW and Victoria without being restricted by strict flight cap numbers or long hotel quarantine stays. Other states and territories followed over the next few months.

==== 2022 ====
On 21 February 2022, border restrictions were removed for all vaccinated people, including non-citizens such as tourists and new immigrants, effectively opening Australia up to the world.

On 18 April 2022, further restrictions on international travel that had been imposed under the Biosecurity Act were removed, allowing cruise ships to operate in Australia for the first time in over 2 years (although only in states where the state government was willing to allow cruise ships, such as NSW, Queensland and Victoria).

=== National Cabinet ===
On 13 March 2020, the National Cabinet, a form of national crisis cabinet akin to a war cabinet, was created following a meeting of the Council of Australian Governments (COAG). This is the first time such a cabinet has been proclaimed since World War II, and the only time in Australian history that a crisis cabinet has included state and territory leaders. The cabinet consists of the premiers and chief ministers of the Australian states and territories and meets weekly during the crisis. At its first meeting on 13 March, the National Cabinet announced that gatherings of more than 500 people should be cancelled from 15 March. Schools, universities, workplaces, public transport and airports were not included in this recommendation. Prime Minister Morrison also announced that he intended to attend a Rugby League match on 14 March; "I do still plan to go to the football on Saturday" but later decided against attending the match.

On 29 March, the Cabinet agreed to stricter limits to apply from midnight on 30 March: a limit on both indoor and outdoor gatherings of two people except weddings (5) and funerals (10), and people of the same household or family; strong guidance to all Australians is to stay home unless for necessary shopping, health care, exercise, and work and study that can't be done remotely; public playgrounds, skate parks and outside gyms to be closed. It was left to individual states to enforce these guidelines. They also agreed to a moratorium on evictions for six months for both commercial and residential tenancies suffering financial distress.

On 2 April 2020, the Federal government announced the temporary provision of free childcare so that people could continue working, and to prevent closure of childcare centres. The Government paid half each centre's operating costs. The free childcare ended on 12 July, and the previous Child Care Subsidy was reintroduced.

=== Human biosecurity emergency declaration ===
On 18 March 2020, a human biosecurity emergency was declared in Australia owing to the risks to human health posed by the COVID-19 pandemic, after a National Security Committee meeting the previous day. The Biosecurity Act 2015 specifies that the Governor-General may declare such an emergency exists if the Health Minister (currently Greg Hunt) is satisfied that "a listed human disease is posing a severe and immediate threat, or is causing harm, to human health on a nationally significant scale". This gives the minister sweeping powers, including imposing restrictions or preventing the movement of people and goods between specified places, and evacuations. The Biosecurity (Human Biosecurity Emergency) (Human Coronavirus with Pandemic Potential) Declaration 2020 was declared by the Governor-General, David Hurley, under Section 475 of the Act. The Biosecurity (Human Biosecurity Emergency) (Human Coronavirus with Pandemic Potential) (Emergency Requirements) Determination 2020, made by the Health Minister on the same day, forbids international cruise ships from entering Australian ports. This ban remains in place until 17 December 2021 at the earliest.

A social distancing rule of four square metres (43 sq ft) per person in any enclosed space was agreed by National Cabinet on 20 March, to be implemented through State and Territory laws. On 22 March 2020, the State governments of New South Wales and Victoria imposed a mandatory closure of non-essential services, while the Governments of Western Australia and South Australia imposed border closures.

On 22 March, Morrison announced a closure of places of social gathering, including registered and licensed clubs, licensed premises in hotels and bars, entertainment venues, including but not restricted to cinemas, casinos and nightclubs and places of worship. Cafes and restaurants could remain open but were limited to takeaway food. Similarly, enclosed spaces for funerals and things of that nature would have to follow the strict four-square-metre rule. These measures (labelled stage 1 in anticipation of possible future measures) were effective immediately at midday, 23 March. Morrison stated that he would like schools to remain open, but parents could keep children at home if they wished to.

On 25 March 2020, the Health Minister made a second determination under the Biosecurity Act 2015, the Biosecurity (Human Biosecurity Emergency) (Human Coronavirus with Pandemic Potential) (Overseas Travel Ban Emergency Requirements) Determination 2020, which "forbids Australian citizens and permanent residents from leaving Australian territory by air or sea as a passenger". On the same day, the Prime Minister announced a further set of restrictions, labelled stage 2 restrictions, effective midnight that night. These involved mainly smaller businesses, such as nail salons and tattoo parlours, while some, such as personal training sessions, were limited to 10 people. At the same time, other gatherings were restricted, such as weddings (5 people) and funerals (10 people).

At 12:00 am on Tuesday 31 March, restrictions were announced on indoor and outdoor gatherings, which were called stage 3 by the media, although the label "stage 3" was not part of the official announcement. The new rule limited gatherings to two people, although it did not apply to members of the same household.

On 14 April, the Federal government announced the "COVIDSafe" digital contact tracing app.

On 25 April 2020, the Biosecurity (Human Biosecurity Emergency) (Human Coronavirus with Pandemic Potential) (Emergency Requirements—Public Health Contact Information) Determination 2020, made under subsection 477(1) of the Act, was signed into law by the Health Minister. The purpose of the new legislation was "to make contact tracing faster and more effective by encouraging public acceptance and uptake of COVIDSafe", COVIDSafe being the new mobile app created for the purpose. The function of the app was to record contact between any two people who both had the app on their phones when they come within 1.5 metres (4.9 ft) of each other. The encrypted data would remain on the phone for 21 days of not encountering a person logged with confirmed COVID-19.

On 3 September 2020, the human biosecurity emergency period under the Biosecurity Act 2015 was extended until 17 December.

=== National COVID-19 Commission Advisory Board ===
On 25 March, the National COVID-19 Coordination Commission (NCCC) was established by the Prime Minister as a strategic advisory body for the national response to the pandemic. (On 27 July 2020, the Prime Minister renamed the organisation to the "National COVID-19 Commission Advisory Board" (NCC).) The NCC's role includes providing advice on public-private partnerships and coordination to mitigate the social and economic impacts of the pandemic.

On 29 March, Prime Minister Morrison announced in a press conference following a National Cabinet meeting that public gatherings would be limited to two people, while also urging Australians over the age of 70, Australians with chronic illness over the age of 60 and Indigenous Australians over the age of 50 to stay home and self-isolate. Morrison also clarified that there were only four acceptable reasons for Australians to leave their houses: shopping for essentials; for medical or compassionate needs; exercise in compliance with the public gathering restriction of two people; and for work or education purposes.

=== National COVID-19 Clinical Evidence Taskforce ===
In March 2020, the National COVID-19 Clinical Evidence Taskforce was set up, which is an independent consortium of 34 national peak clinical groups. Hundreds of health professionals from around the country review the latest research on the disease, and maintain evidence-based data and recommendations for clinicians to enable them to provide the best care for people with COVID-19. Initial funding came from the Commonwealth Department of Health, Victorian Department of Health, the Ian Potter Foundation, the Walter Cottman Endowment Fund, and the Lord Mayors' Charitable Foundation. As of September 2022 it is funded by the Commonwealth Department of Health.

=== Vaccine supply ===
The Australian government entered into agreements with Pfizer/BioNTech, University of Oxford/AstraZeneca, Novavax, the University of Queensland and COVAX for the supply of vaccines. The University of Queensland vaccine was abandoned in December 2020 after trials revealed that, while it was safe, it triggered false positives on HIV tests. The Therapeutic Goods Administration (TGA) provisionally approved the Pfizer vaccine in January 2021. The Australian government ordered 10 million doses, with the first 80,000 to be delivered in February 2021, but production problems and the imposition of export controls by the European Union (EU) onto deliveries to countries outside Europe made meeting the delivery schedule problematic.

Delivery issues also affected deliveries of the Oxford–AstraZeneca COVID-19 vaccine, which was provisionally approved by the TGA in February, and received final approval in March. Orders were reduced from 3.8 million to 1.2 million doses of this vaccine, which was manufactured in Belgium, and arrival was pushed back to March 2021. CSL Limited began manufacturing 50 million doses of the AstraZeneca vaccine in Melbourne in November 2020. Deliveries were expected to commence in March. The AstraZeneca vaccine could be stored at normal refrigeration temperatures of 2 to 8 °C (36 to 46 °F), whereas the Pfizer vaccine required storage at −70 °C (−94 °F). However, concerns were raised about the efficacy of the AstraZeneca vaccine. The Immunology & Cell Biology called for a pause in its rollout, as the efficacy of the vaccine reported by trials was insufficient to achieve the desired herd immunity effect. CSL management declined an invitation to appear before an Australian Senate inquiry.

Although the Prime Minister of Australia, Scott Morrison, said that Australia would be "at the front of the queue", and the Minister for Health and Aged Care, Greg Hunt, claimed that Australia would be among the first countries to receive COVID-19 vaccines, 61 other countries had already commenced vaccinating their citizens by the end of January 2021, while the Australian vaccination rollout was not scheduled to commence for another month.

On 15 February 2021, 142,000 doses of the Pfizer–BioNTech COVID-19 vaccine arrived in Australia. The first doses were due to be administered on 22 February. The world-wide distribution of the vaccine has been described as "the largest logistics effort in the world since World War" by Dr Roberto Perez-Franco of the Deakin University's Centre for Supply Chain and Logistics. This was followed, on 28 February, by 300,000 doses of the Oxford–AstraZeneca vaccine, which arrived at Sydney airport. It was planned that most Australians would be vaccinated with this vaccine, the majority manufactured in Australia by CSL Limited. On 5 March, Italy and the European Union blocked a shipment of 250,000 doses of the Oxford−AstraZeneca vaccine from Italy to Australia, citing low COVID-19 case numbers in Australia and the limited availability of vaccines in the EU.

Local manufacturing began in November 2020. On 16 February, the first vials of COVID-19 vaccine produced in Australia came off the production line at the CSL Behring plant in Broadmeadows, Melbourne. This is the active raw vaccine material. The vaccine vials are filled and packaged into doses by Seqirus, a CSL subsidiary in Parkville, Melbourne. Production of the AstraZeneca vaccine in Australia received its final approval from the TGA on 21 March. Some front line health care workers were reported to have preferred the Pfizer vaccine over the AstraZeneca one.

The Australian government had also signed a deal with Novavax for 51 million doses of its vaccine, with supply originally slated for "mid-2021". As of April 2021, it had yet to be approved by the TGA. It is not manufactured in Australia, so like the other imported vaccines, its availability was uncertain. In trials it was reported to be 95.6 per cent effective against COVID-19, and an 86.3 per cent effective against the variant identified in the UK. Australia's first human trials of a candidate COVID-19 vaccine was Novavax's NVX-CoV2373 which began in Melbourne by 26 May 2020.

In a February 2021 pre-budget submission, the Australian Academy of Science renewed its call for the government to develop the capability to produce mRNA vaccine technology in Australia. The ability to mass-produce such vaccines onshore would insulate Australia against supply shocks, and cater for future pandemics and potential biosecurity situations. The mRNA coronavirus vaccines made by Moderna and Pfizer showed strong results in clinical trials and are expected to be easier to reconfigure to cater for new virus variants than more conventional vaccines.

The US Moderna company entered an agreement with the Australian Federal government, announced on 13 May 2021, to provide 25 million doses of its COVID-19 vaccine 'mRNA-1273', subject to TGA approval.

=== Vaccinations ===
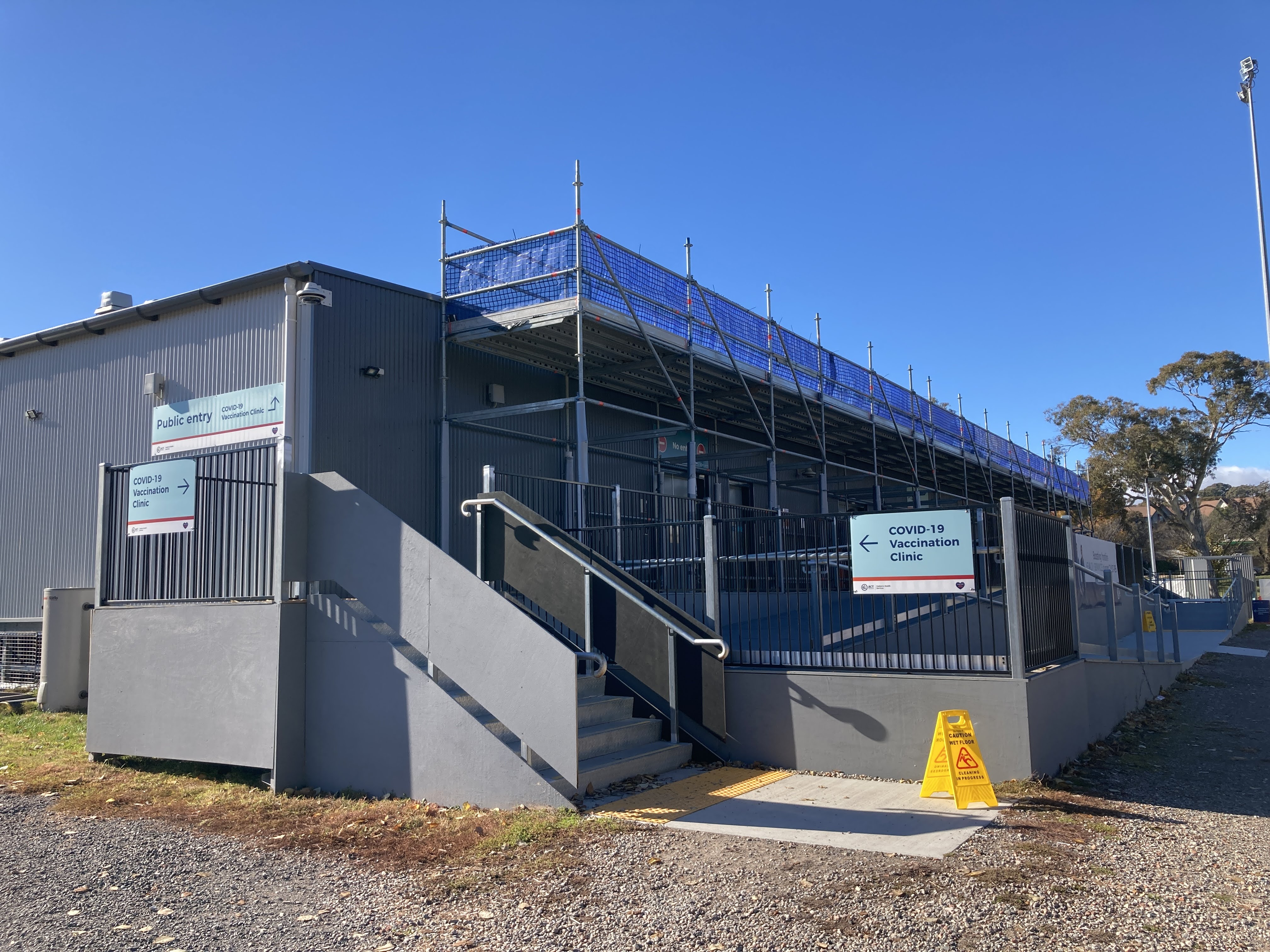
A COVID-19 vaccination clinic in Canberra

The first public COVID-19 vaccination in Australia, with the Pfizer–BioNTech vaccine, took place on 21 February 2021 in Sydney. An 84-year-old aged care resident was the first Australian to receive the vaccine following TGA approval. Prime Minister Morrison and Chief Medical Officer Professor Paul Kelly also received vaccinations.

The first Australian to receive the Oxford–AstraZeneca vaccine was a doctor in regional South Australia on 5 March 2021 at Murray Bridge Hospital.

More than 2 million COVID-19 vaccinations had been administered in Australia by 28 April 2021, but this was 3 million short of original plans. By 6 June, over 5 million vaccinations had been administered. Approximately 4.45 million were first doses, nearly 570,000 were second doses.

On 5 October 2021, Australia reached 80% of the eligible population (aged 16 and older) having had at least one dose of COVID-19 vaccine.

==== Adverse reactions ====
As of 18 July 2021, there have been a total of over 10.125 million vaccine doses administered of which 41,406 adverse events following vaccination have been reported. However, not all reported adverse events were attributable to and associated with vaccination. The most common adverse effects following immunisation as reported to the TGA are predictable and have been observed with many other vaccines. They include headache, muscle pain, fever, chills and injection site reactions. The TGA reviews reports of deaths in people who have recently been vaccinated and as of 22 July 2021 found six that were linked to immunisation. These deaths were all related to a first dose of the AstraZeneca vaccine – five had thrombosis with thrombocytopenia syndrome (TTS) and one had immune thrombocytopenia (ITP) out of 6.1 million doses of the AstraZeneca vaccine.

==== Vaccine hesitancy and messaging ====
There were calls for a more effective advertising campaign that would go beyond presenting facts that inform, to use of emotion to change people's behaviour to overcome apparent lack of "trust in the government". On 23 May 2021 Health Minister Greg Hunt reiterated that a sufficient supply of Pfizer is expected to begin arriving in October, with AMA president Omar Khorshid adding this promised supply means "everyone who wanted it could have both doses by Christmas" of 2021. Nevertheless, government, AMA and ATAGI advice remains for everyone to vaccinate as soon as possible and not to wait, because the (potentially future) risk of community transmission in Australia remains a possibility, and which until 17 June 2021 over 9 million Australian residents over 50 had to weigh against the 'tiny' risk of death associated with the AstraZeneca vaccine that (according to best data available at the time) was probable to manifest for approximately 9–14 Australians, or approximately 19 Australians according to EMA data.

Health Minister Greg Hunt said on 17 June 2021 that the recommended advice from ATAGI was that the Oxford-AstraZeneca vaccine should be administered only to people aged 60 years and over. The advice also stated that second doses of the Oxford-AstraZeneca were still recommended for those under 60 years of age. Everyone under 60 would be offered the Pfizer vaccine. Hunt stated that about 815,000 Australians between ages 50 and 59 had already received a first dose of the AstraZeneca vaccine, with Pfizer now available to the approximately 2.1 million remaining Australians in that age group.

In a survey conducted in June 2021, about 15 percent of respondents not yet vaccinated identified wanting a different vaccine "to what was available to them" as a factor holding them back from getting vaccinated. Since only 18–39 and 60+ year-olds are eligible for one vaccine (i.e., AstraZeneca) but not the other (i.e., Pfizer-BioNTech), making Pfizer-BioNTech available to everyone would obviate one factor holding back vaccination uptake.

== National Plan to transition Australia's National COVID-19 Response ==
On 30 July 2021, the federal government released a revised four-phase plan to transition Australia's National COVID-19 Response from its current pre-vaccination settings, focussing on continued suppression of community transmission, to post-vaccination settings focussed on prevention of serious illness, hospitalisation and fatality, and the public health management of other infectious diseases. The phases transitions are triggered in a jurisdiction when the average vaccination rates across the nation have reached the threshold and that rate is achieved in a jurisdiction expressed as a percentage of the eligible population (16+), based on the scientific modelling conducted for the COVID-19 Risk Analysis and Response Task Force. As of 6 November 2021, Australia is in phase-Three, which is "Vaccination Consolidation Phase".

In a statement by the Prime Minister on 30 July 2021, it was announced that the federal governments and all states and territories had agreed in-principle to the updated plan.

There has been no date set for each phase. The percentage fully vaccinated eligible population to transition into the second phase, Phase B, is 70%, and 80% into the third phase, Phase C. No target was decided for Phase D instead being sporadically put into effect from 21 February to 6 July when unvaccinated travellers were freely allowed to enter Australia.

On 16 November 2021, the percentage of the eligible adult population aged 16 and older fully vaccinated reached 83.9%.

On 23 March 2022, the percentage of the eligible adult population aged 16 and older fully vaccinated reached 95.0%

National Plan to transition Australia's COVID-19 response
Measures may include	Estimated start date	Target percentage of fully vaccinated eligible adult population (16+) (Note: Phase progression depends upon the achievement of the threshold of certain vaccination percentage, scientific modelling of vaccination threshold is completed at Doherty Institute)	Status
Phase One - Vaccinate, prepare and pilot
Implement the national vaccination plan to offer every Australian an opportunity to be vaccinated as soon as possible; International arrival cap temporarily reduced by 50% (announced with the first version of the plan); Trial of returned vaccinated travellers with home quarantine system and a pilot program of international students; International Freight Assistance Mechanism extended; Preparation for vaccination booster plan & establishment of digital vaccination passport at Airport; Undertake a further review of the national hotel quarantine network	1 July 2021 – 19 October 2021	Completed	Phase Completed
Phase Two - Vaccination Transition Phase
Lockdowns less likely but possible; Ease in domestic restrictions for vaccinated residents; International border caps and low-level international arrivals with safe and proportionate quarantine; Restore international arrival cap for unvaccinated travellers and larger cap for vaccinated return travellers; Capped entry of International students and economic visa holders; Prepare/implement vaccine booster program (depending on timing)	20 Oct 2021 – 5 Nov 2021	70% Completed	Phase Completed
Phase Three - Vaccination Consolidation Phase
Highly targeted lockdowns only; Exempt vaccinated residents from all domestic restrictions; No cap on return of vaccinated travellers; Increased capped entry of student, economic, and humanitarian visa holders; Lift all restrictions on outbound travel for vaccinated Australians; Extend travel bubble for unrestricted travel to new candidate countries (e.g. Singapore, Pacific island countries)	6 Nov 2021 – 6 July 2022	80% Fully vaccinated	Phase Completed
Phase Four - Post-Vaccination Phase (Back to Normal)
Live with COVID-19: management consistent with other infectious diseases; Open international borders, quarantine for high-risk inbound travel (Implemented 21 Feb); Uncapped entry for all inbound vaccinated persons, without quarantine (Implemented 21 Feb); Uncapped entry of non-vaccinated travellers subject to pre-flight and on arrival testing; Vaccine boosters as necessary	6 July 2022 – present	Completed	Phase Completed

=== Transition to endemic stage ===
On 11 October 2021, New South Wales ended the lockdown and became the first jurisdiction in Australia to begin Phase B of the national plan and endemic management of COVID-19. A week later on 18 October restrictions were again relaxed. Victoria and the Australian Capital Territory began a similar staggered easing of restrictions from mid-October ultimately culminating with all three jurisdictions ending international travel quarantine, density restrictions along with COVID-19 close contact and isolation rules being reduced throughout November.

South Australia, Tasmania, Queensland and the Northern Territory managed to remain in a state of COVID-19 elimination (albeit the later two suffering minor controlled outbreaks in the week before opening) prior to their transition to 'living with COVID' and thus voluntarily introduced COVID-19 into the community to allow for resumption of domestic and international travel.

In December, the arrival of the Omicron variant prompted states to return to low-level restrictions such as mask wearing and hospitality density limits with even COVID-free Western Australia introducing restrictions to fight small scale outbreaks. However, due to the sheer number of people being infected with COVID-19, the rules for people exposed to COVID-19 was significantly reduced to alleviate worker shortages. Queensland's Chief Health Officer John Gerrard stated that spreading COVID-19 was "necessary" in order to transition from the "pandemic stage to an endemic stage", noting that measures in place were intended to reduce strain on hospitals and buy time for booster shots.

Western Australia delayed its transition from COVID-zero on 20 January 2022 citing the risk from the Omicron variant. However a significant COVID outbreak in February made the government re-open the border after modelling showed that it would have little impact on the cases of COVID-19 due to the outbreak being uncontrolled.

=== Lifting measures ===
On 1 January, former Australian Deputy Chief Medical Officer Nick Coatsworth who served in the first year of the pandemic, declared that 2022 would be the year the pandemic ended in Australia as restrictions eased and immunity built up throughout the year.

Restrictions began slowly easing all across Australia throughout 2022 with Victoria and New South Wales returning to pre-omicron restrictions from February 2022. Other jurisdictions followed suit shortly after in easing rules such as mask mandates. South Australia dropped its overtly harsh close contact 14 day isolation requirement in March following the election of Peter Malinauskas. The definition of close contact was changed from 15 minutes with a COVID-19 case to the nationally defined 4 hours On 25 March 2022, the Minister for Health Greg Hunt announced that the Biosecurity Emergency Determination, as well as pre-flight COVID-19 tests for international arrivals would end on 17 April. Close contact 7-day isolation was dropped in most states from mid April with the rule replaced with 7 days of mask wearing and testing throughout the week. In late April Western Australia brought COVID-19 restrictions in line with the rest of the country with close contacts only required to wear a mask for 7 days, while mask mandates were dropped in all settings except public/private transport and healthcare settings. In June Australian health officials agreed to end the mask mandate in airport terminals but not on aircraft.

On 2 July, as COVID-19 cases began increasing due to the colder months, it was revealed that Australian health officials were discussing the return of the indoor mask mandate. This ultimately never came to fruition. In mid-July, New South Wales Premier Dominic Perrottet pushed for COVID-19 isolation requirements to be dropped all together or at least reduced to 5 days. This was rejected due to the ongoing winter wave. On 9 September restrictions again began relaxing. The mask mandate on aircraft was scrapped nationwide and Western Australia ended the mask mandate on passenger transport. At the same time the isolation time for COVID-19 cases was reduced to 5 days. 9 September was also the last day cases were reported daily in Australia as the country transitioned to weekly reporting instead. On 14 September, COVID-19 disaster payment for people who had to isolate due to COVID-19 was extended so long as isolating was mandated by the government. South Australia, New South Wales, Queensland all ended the mask mandate on passenger transport on 21 September. Victoria ended the mandate on 22 September after it had been in place since June 2020.

On 30 September, all Australian leaders declared the emergency response finished and announced the end of the requirement for people to isolate from 14 October if they had COVID-19. This was due in part due to high levels of 'hybrid immunity' and very low case numbers. Victoria ended its pandemic declaration on 13 October and testing was as a result also scaled back, as Rapid Antigen Tests would no longer need to be reported in Victoria, and also New South Wales.

On 1 November, Queensland's state of emergency was left to expire and the last restrictions were removed, however a recommendation 'traffic light' system was introduced to advise Queenslanders on when it was recommended to isolate for COVID-19 or when they were advised to wear a mask. Western Australia let its state of emergency expire on 4 November and also ended the last restrictions. The Northern Territory ended the last post-emergency directions on 11 November. South Australia allowed the remaining public health directions to expire on 23 November. New South Wales ended its state public health emergency on 30 November. The last COVID-19 restriction in Australia was ended on 28 December with the Australian Capital Territory repealing its COVID-19 management direction, used just for enforcing test reporting.

== Post pandemic ==
In the winter of 2023, for the first time since before the pandemic, other viral diseases such as influenza and respiratory syncytial virus were more prevalent in the community and hospitals. Queensland as a result, dropped its traffic light system which had been on green and not recommending mask wearing anywhere for several months. Cost of living pressures and the fatigue caused by the pandemic were blamed on low influenza vaccination uptake in 2023.

== Impacts ==
=== Arts ===
Before the crisis, 600,000 Australians were employed in the arts, an industry which added around A$3.2 billion to export revenues. The rate of employment in the sector grew at a faster rate than the rest of the economy. According to government figures, "cultural and creative activity contributed to A$112 billion (6.4% of GDP) to Australia's economy in 2016–17".

Beginning in the second week of March 2020, Australian institutions began announcing reduced services, and then complete closures. One of the first casualties was the Melbourne International Comedy Festival, with organisers announcing on 13 March 2020 that the 2020 festival had been cancelled entirely. Opera Australia announced it would close on 15 March. The national closure of all cultural institutions was mandated on 24 March, with subsequent restrictions on public gatherings. Consequently, many cultural events were also cancelled, including the Sydney Writers' Festival. According to the Australian Bureau of Statistics, by the beginning of April, "Arts and Recreation services" was the sector of the national economy with the smallest proportion of its business still in operation—at 47%. A graph in Guardian Australia showing businesses by sector that had ceased trading between June 2019 and 30 March 2020 shows over 50% of arts and recreation services, the hardest hit of any sector (information media and telecommunications is next, at about 34%). Adrian Collette, CEO of the Australia Council for the Arts, the government's arts funding and advisory body, described the impact on the cultural and creative sectors as "catastrophic".

The Australian film industry has been severely impacted, with at least 60 shoots being halted and about 20,000 people out of work. On Monday 23 March, all productions funded by Screen Australia were postponed. As of 15 April 2020, after some improvement in COVID-19 statistics in Australia, Screen Australia continues to fund work and process applications, intending to use all of its 2019–20 budget. Film industry organisations such as Screen Producers Australia (SPA) and the Media, Entertainment and Arts Alliance (MEAA) have been lobbying the government for a support package specific to the screen industry, and to expand the JobKeeper requirements so that those in the screen industry are better covered. Many in the film industry are employed by Special-purpose entities—temporary companies that cease trading once production has finished—which cannot easily prove that their turnover has fallen by 30% or more. SPA said that the industry shutdown had cost more than A$500 million, with about A$20 million of lost export revenue.

One hundred and nineteen films and TV shows have been halted, with only a few shows (such as MasterChef Australia and Shaun Micallef's Mad as Hell) continuing production through the pandemic. The TV soap Neighbours was the first English-language TV drama series in the world to announce that resumption of production would begin soon after 20 April 2020.

Like other governments around the world, the Australian government has acknowledged the economic, cultural and social value of the arts industry. The Australia Council has redirected about A$5 million to "new programs designed to provide immediate relief to Australian artists, arts workers and arts organisations to support their livelihoods, practice and operations during the COVID-19 pandemic" (the "Resilience Fund"), and is also hosting weekly meetings to address the concerns of specific sections of the industry, such as Indigenous creatives and organisations, live performance and public gatherings, and various peak bodies. Several state governments have also provided relief packages.

In early April, the federal government announced a package of A$27 million in specific arts funding: A$7 million for the Indigenous Visual Arts Industry Support program, A$10 million for Regional Arts Australia's regional arts fund, and A$10 million for Support Act, a charity founded in 1997 that provides financial support and counselling to people in the music industry in Australia. However, the "JobKeeper" scheme specifically excluded "freelancers and casuals on short-term contracts, or who have worked for a series of employers in the last year", thus excluding a large proportion of arts and cultural sector professionals, who rely on short-term contracts.

However, most of the arts sector's more than 193,000 workers were still unable to access the JobKeeper payments, despite being defined as sole traders, and an estimated A$330 million worth of paid performances cancelled. The Australia Institute recommended a A$750 million rescue package for the industry, while Arts Minister Paul Fletcher said that arts workers should utilise existing support measures.

On 4 May 2020, the company operating the Carriageworks multi-arts venue in Sydney declared it would be entering voluntary administration and closing, citing an "irreparable loss of income" due to government bans on events during the COVID-19 pandemic and the consequent negative impact on the arts sector. Carriageworks was the first major arts venue in the country to collapse suddenly after the hit to income caused by the strict social distancing rules enforced by state and federal governments, but others feared the same fate, after being forced to shut their doors in late March.

On 13 May 2020, the Art Gallery of South Australia announced that it would reopen on 8 June.

On 24 June 2020, the federal government announced a $250 million rescue package for the arts, comprising grants and loans. The package includes $75m for a grants program for new festivals, concerts, tours and events; $90m in loans to help fund new productions; $50m to help film and television producers unable to access insurance due to the pandemic, to enable them to restart production; and $35 million in direct financial assistance for struggling Commonwealth-funded organisations, including theatre, dance, music and circus. The Australian Recording Industry Association (ARIA) welcomed the boost, but critics said that it was not nearly enough, especially with so many workers in the industry still ineligible for JobKeeper payments.

=== Economic ===
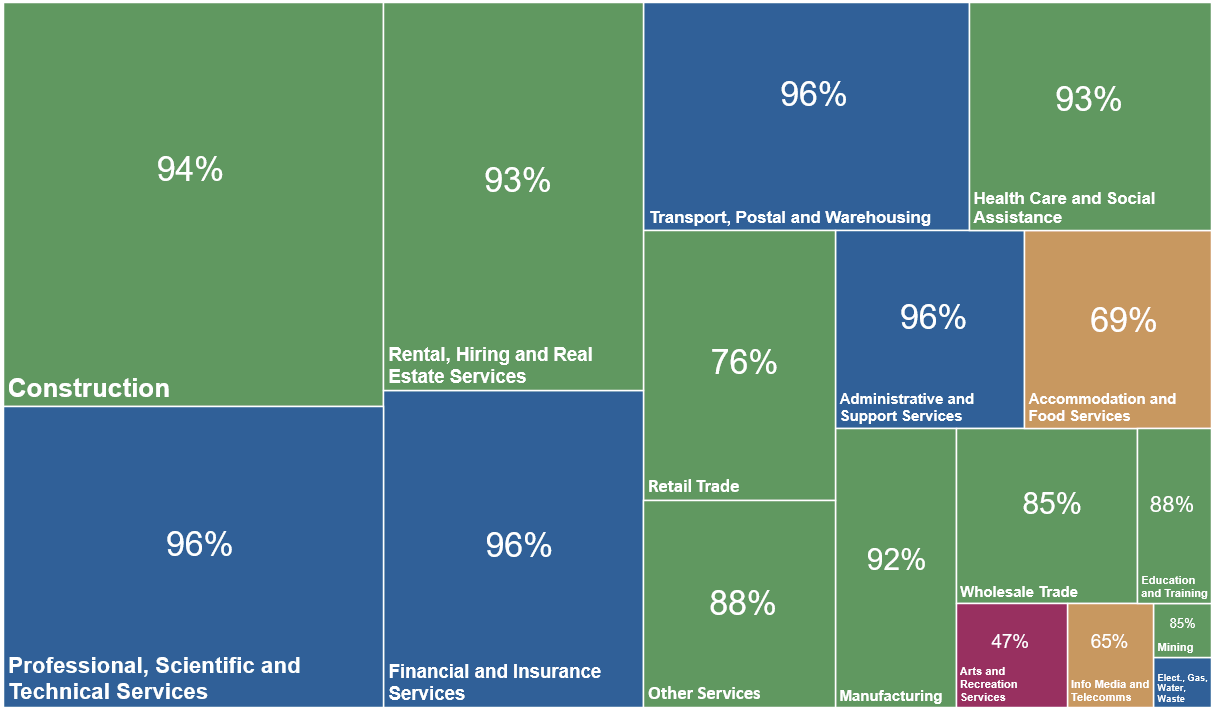
The area of each segment represents the number of businesses per sector of the Australian economy; the figure represents the percentage still operating. By 7 April, the Arts and Recreation sector (shown in red) was the worst hit.

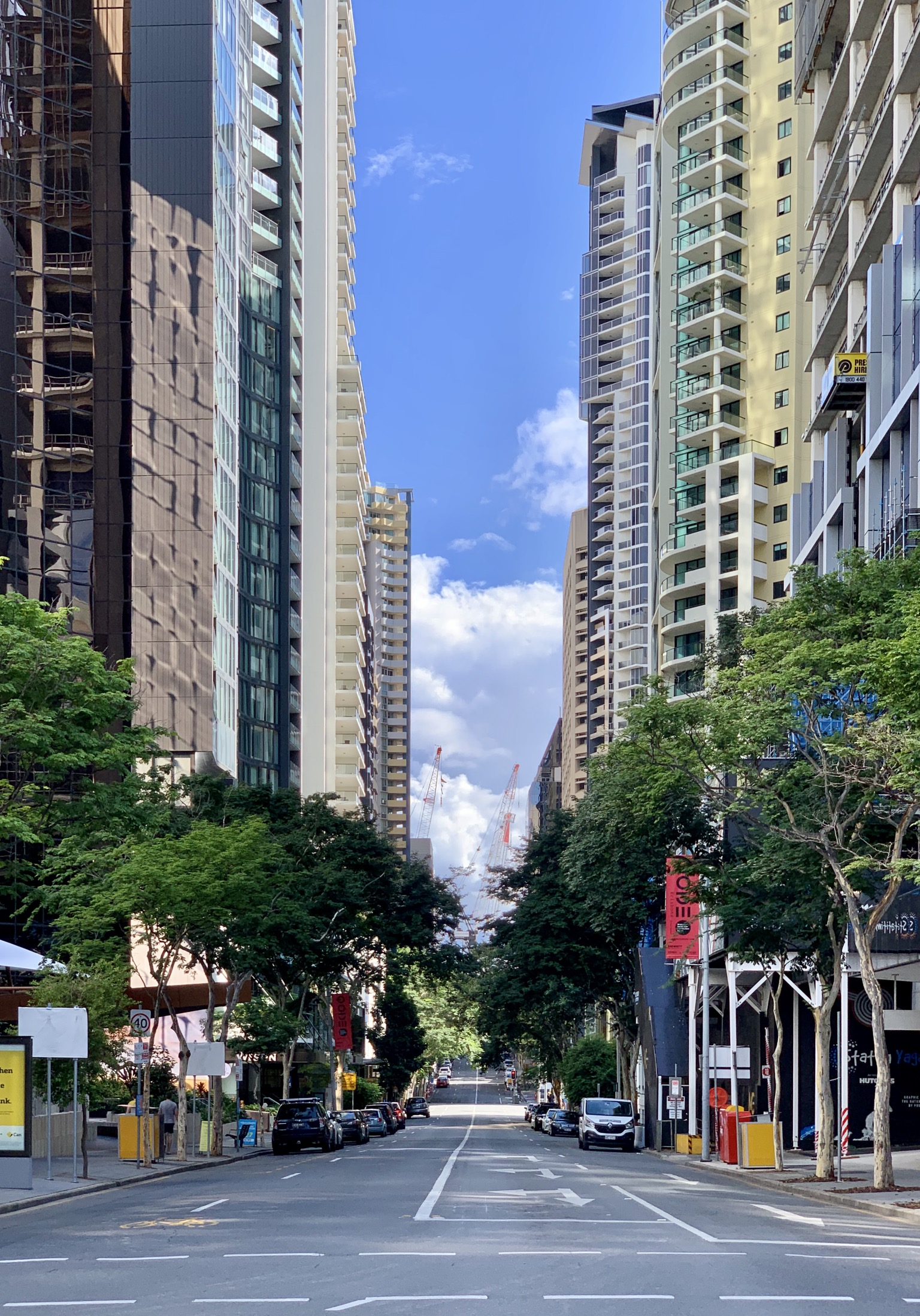
An empty street in the Brisbane central business district, 29 March 2020

On 3 March 2020, the Reserve Bank of Australia became the first central bank to cut interest rates in response to the outbreak. Official interest rates were cut by 0.25% to a record low of 0.5%.

On 12 March, the federal government announced a planned A$17.6 billion stimulus package. The package consists of multiple parts: a one-off payment to pensioners, social security recipients, veteran and other income support recipients and eligible concession card holders, payments of A$2,000–A$25,000 to affected small businesses, an increase to the threshold for the Instant Asset Write-off Program, tax concessions for investments, a small business 50% wage subsidy for 120,000 trainees and apprentices, and A$1 billion in subsidies for heavily affected industries.

On 17 March, the New South Wales government announced a A$2.3 billion stimulus package, including A$700 million for health services. A$450 million was allocated to waive payroll tax for 3 months, and $250 million was allocated so state-owned buildings and public schools could employ more cleaners. Seven hundred and fifty million dollars was allocated for capital works and public asset maintenance.

On 18 March, the Northern Territory government announced an economic stimulus package of A$60 million.

On 19 March, the Reserve Bank again cut interest rates by a further 0.25%, from 0.5% to 0.25%, the lowest in Australian history.

In March 2020, the Australian Bureau of Statistics (ABS) began releasing a number of additional statistical products to assess the economic impacts on the outbreak on the Australian economy. Data on retail trade turnover indicated a 0.4% rise in turnover in February 2020. Negative effects on some areas of the retail sector (particularly tourism-dependent businesses) were offset by a rise in food retail turnover, with supermarkets showing a large rise in sales, mainly arising from panic buying.

On 22 March, the Federal government announced a second stimulus package of A$66 billion, increasing the amount of total financial package offered to A$89 billion. This included several new measures like an extra A$550 'Coronavirus Supplement' payment to those on income support, paid from 27 April to 24 September 2020, and relaxed eligibility criteria for individuals on JobSeeker Payment, granting A$100,000 to small and medium-sized businesses and A$715 million to Australian airports and airlines. It also allowed individuals affected by the outbreak to access up to A$10,000 of their superannuation during 2019–2020 and also being able to take an additional same amount for the next year.

On 30 March, the Australian Government announced a six-month, A$130 billion JobKeeper payment. The JobKeeper payment provides businesses with up to A$1,500 a fortnight per full-time or part-time employee, or casual employee that has worked for that business for over a year. To be eligible, a business with an annual revenue of under A$1 billion must have lost 30% turnover since 1 March, or 50% for businesses over A$1 billion. The entire payment made to businesses for an employee must then, by law, be paid to that employee in lieu of normal pay. This response came after the enormous job losses seen just a week prior when an estimated 1 million Australians lost their jobs. The program was backdated to 1 March with the aim of re-employing many people who had lost their jobs in the weeks before. In the first hour of the scheme, over 8,000 businesses registered to receive the payments. The program is one of the largest economic packages ever implemented in modern Australian history. JobKeeper ended on 28 March 2021.

On 11 April, the South Australian state government announced its own A$350 million economic stimulus measures.

In late April, the Federal government announced A$94.6 million of support was available for zoos, wildlife parks and aquariums forced to close by coronavirus restrictions. This was part of previously announced economic stimulus measures.

The 2020 Federal Budget, normally delivered in May, was delayed until 6 October because of the COVID-19 pandemic.

On 22 May 2020, the Treasury and Australian Taxation Office announced there had been a miscalculation of A$60 billion in the planned cost of the JobKeeper program. Blaming 1,000 businesses for making "significant errors" on the application form, the Australian Government revealed it had overbudgeted the program, and that it was forecast to cost A$70 billion, not A$130 billion. The Treasury also announced that its original forecast of 6.5 million recipients was inaccurate, and closer to 3.5 million. Prime Minister Scott Morrison celebrated the saving, while the Opposition announced a parliamentary inquiry in an attempt to compel Treasurer Josh Frydenberg to explain the overestimation.

In July 2020, Australian Finance Minister Mathias Cormann, in an interview with the US CNBC news channel, vowed that the government's budget deficit was expected to increase to A$85.8 billion Australian dollars in the financial year ended on 30 June and further widen to A$184.5 billion in the new fiscal year.

On 2 September, the Australian economy went into recession for the first time in nearly thirty years. The country's gross domestic product (GDP) fell 7 per cent in the June quarter. In December, it was announced Australia had pulled out of recession after experiencing a 3.3% growth in GDP in the September quarter. Treasurer Josh Frydenberg stated the effects of the recession had lasting impacts and the recovery was far from over. Australia is set to avoid an economic depression as forecast earlier in 2020, though GDP is likely to have experienced a contraction from 2019 figures.

The 2020 Australian federal budget, delayed from May, is finally delivered on 6 October.

==== "Dine and Discover NSW" ====
On 17 November 2020, the NSW Government announced in the state budget that all NSW residents over 18 years of age would be eligible to receive four A$25 vouchers through Service NSW to help stimulate the economy. Two vouchers are for dining, Monday to Thursday only, excluding public holidays. The other two are to be spent on entertainment, excluding on public holidays. Businesses need to be COVID-safe registered, and sign-up for the scheme. The vouchers cannot be used for gambling, alcohol, cigarettes, retail purchases or accommodation. The program was originally called "Out and About".

Residents will need to have a Service NSW account to receive their vouchers. After trials in Sydney and regional areas, full rollout was scheduled for March. The trials began in Broken Hill, and the Rocks in Sydney on 11 February 2021.

As early as mid-April 2021, the scheme was said by some regional NSW residents to be "city centric'. At this time, the vouchers had been used by less than 10% of the 5 million who can use it. There were calls by NSW opposition political parties for the scheme to be extended beyond its initial 30 June 2021 deadline to use the vouchers. On 9 June 2021, the Dine & Discover scheme was extended by a month to 31 July. The scheme was then extended again to 31 August due to the lockdown in NSW, and then eventually to 30 June 2022. In November 2021, two extra vouchers were granted, one for dining and one for entertainment.

==== 2021 ====
On 22 February 2021, Prime Minister Scott Morrison announced that the JobSeeker Payment base rate would be increased by A$50 a fortnight from April 2021. The payment will rise to A$614 a fortnight, with an estimated cost over forward estimates of A$9 billion. It is also intended to increase the threshold amount recipients can earn before their payment starts to be reduced.

On 26 February 2021, the chief executive of the Australian Airports Association, James Goodwin, said that Australian airports had been losing A$320 million every month during the COVID-19 pandemic. He also said over the past 12 months, job losses amounted to 25 per cent of the airports' workforce.

On 10 March 2021, the Federal Government announced steps worth A$1.2 billion to encourage Australians to holiday within Australia to assist ailing tourist destinations. Between April and July, up to 800,000 airfares to 13 regions normally favoured by international tourists will be halved for domestic travellers.

On 3 June 2021, the Federal Government announced that people who lose work as a result of lockdowns, of at least 7 days' length, may be eligible for a A$325 or A$500 per week Temporary COVID Disaster Payment. To be eligible:

- Person must be older than 17
- Live/ work in a Commonwealth defined hot-spot
- Have less than A$10,000 liquid assets
- Would have worked except for lockdown, and,
  - Will lose income due to lockdown
- Can't access special pandemic or sick leave, or,
  - Have used it up

Those on other types of income support from the Commonwealth, like JobSeeker, are ineligible.

To get the full A$500 payment, the lost work must be at least 20 hours. If the lost work is under 20 hours, the payment is $325.

Victoria announced A$30 million of financial support on 7 June 2021 for residents "locked out of work" by COVID lockdowns. The Victorian government also extended it emergency "hardship support payment" to October. This helps those on temporary or provisional visas who are not able get income from the Commonwealth.

=== Employment ===
The pandemic had significant negative effect on the Australian labour market. In July 2019, unemployment was 5.1%, by July 2020 it peaked at 7.5%, during the pandemic, by the end of 2020 it had fallen to 6.6%. Figures for February to March 2021, released in April, showed unemployment had reduced to 5.8%, 0.4 points higher than at the start to the pandemic.

==== Agricultural worker shortage ====
In September 2020, a report from Ernst & Young stated that pandemic related border restrictions could result in a shortfall of 26,000 pickers over Australia's summer harvest season. Such work is typically reliant on seasonal staff from overseas. As a trial in early September 2020, 160 workers from Vanuatu were allowed into the Northern Territory (NT) to pick mangoes. They arrived on a specially chartered aircraft, and had to undergo the usual 14-day quarantine. It was estimated that the Vanuatuan workers saved A$100 million of fruit from the NT mango harvest being left to rot. The mango industry in the NT was valued at more than A$128 million in 2019, and produces more than half of Australia's mangoes.

On 30 September 2020, PM Scott Morrison announced that: "backpackers, Pacific Islanders and seasonal workers will be able to extend their visas to stay in Australia" and "welfare recipients will be offered incentives to pick fruit."

In late October 2020, some farmers found that they had to plough their produce back into the ground because it could not be harvested, at a loss of A$150,000.

The "Relocation Assistance to Take Up a Job" (RATTUAJ) program, scheduled to run from 1 November 2020 to 31 December 2021, offered A$6,000 for transport, moving expenses, accommodation and work clothing for welfare recipients willing to relocate to a regional area for a minimum of 6 weeks for short term agricultural jobs. Up to early December 2020, the relocation incentives for unemployed Australians appeared to be failing. After operating for a month, Federal Department of Employment figures showed only 148 people had taken up the offer.

Shortage of workers for harvesting can not only mean unpicked produce being left to rot or be ploughed back into fields, and farmers possibly not planting the next year, it creates an economic loss to those farmers, and can also noticeably increase prices for consumers.

To encourage potential workers to return to Australia, on 19 January 2022, the Australian Government offered to repay visa fees, about A$600, to backpackers on working holiday-maker visas, who come to Australia in the following 12 weeks, and to international students who arrive within the following 8 weeks. There are about 23,000 backpackers and 150,000 students who have a visa but are not in Australia.

=== Health ===
Influenza

In 2020, due to international travel restrictions, social distancing and lockdowns because of the COVID-19 pandemic, the rate of influenza in Australia, and deaths from it, were at "record lows". In mid-June 2021 the flu was said to be almost non-existent. In May 2019 there were over 30,000 cases, in May 2021, only 71. Professor Ian Barr of the Peter Doherty Institute remarked that influenza was "either eradicated, or it's at such low levels we're having trouble detecting it." 2019 in Australia was particularly bad with 800 flu deaths, below 40 in 2020, and no reported deaths as of June 2021.

In a March 2022 statement, the ATAGI noted that they expect a resurgence in influenza for the 2022 flu season due to the opening of borders.

Health checks

On 4 February 2021, World Cancer Day, the government organisation Cancer Australia said that in 2020 between January and September, there were nearly 150,000 less diagnostic tests for cancer performed, compared to the same period in 2019.

In August 2021, breast cancer screening appointments were being cancelled by BreastScreen NSW due to the lockdown in Sydney that began in late June. Some nurses were retasked to pandemic response, leading to some screening clinics and mobile clinics being closed.

=== Indigenous Australians ===
Aboriginal Australians and Torres Strait Islanders have poorer health outcomes and a lower life expectancy than the non-Indigenous Australian population, particularly those living in remote areas, which, along with overcrowded housing, makes them one of the communities most vulnerable to the virus. The remote Anangu Pitjantjatjara Yankunytjatjara (APY lands) in South Australia, whose population has many comorbidities, high rates of tobacco use, overcrowded housing and overall poor hygiene, introduced restricted access to the lands in early March to protect their people, especially elders, from the virus. The Minister for Indigenous Australians, Ken Wyatt, said it was a sensible move, and that the federal government would work with them. (A later call to evacuate elders to Adelaide by the APY Art Centre Collective was not put into operation.)

The federal government set up a national Indigenous advisory group in early March 2020, to create an emergency response plan for Aboriginal communities. The 43-page plan was published in March, and in late March, the Prime Minister that advised that Indigenous Australians over the age of 50 (along with everyone over 70 and those with a chronic illness over 60), should stay at home as much as possible. The Department of Health created a web page dedicated to advice for Indigenous people and remote communities, and the National Indigenous Australians Agency has one dedicated to the government's response to COVID-19. On 18 April the NIAA announced a government package of A$123 million of "targeted measures to support Indigenous businesses and communities to increase their responses to COVID-19", for the coming two financial years.

The Northern Territory developed a remote health pandemic plan, with NT Health setting up a number of remote clinics across the Territory. All non-essential travel to 76 remote communities was banned, and a 14-day isolation period imposed for those residents wanting to return home from regional centres, and in May 2020, health officials suggested that these controls should stay in place for the foreseeable future. In mid-March 2020 a group of senior NT clinicians called for 16 measures to be implemented as soon as possible to help protect vulnerable communities. Other states and territories have provided advice on their health agency websites.

In May 2020, a group of Paakantyi families set up a tent town on the banks of the Darling River near Wilcannia in New South Wales, to escape the threat of the disease from overcrowded accommodation in the town.

In late August 2021, a man in his 50s who died at Dubbo Hospital, is believed to be the first Aboriginal or Torres Strait Islander COVID-19 related death. He was not vaccinated. By 7 September 2021, there had been 2 more deaths of indigenous Australians, who were also not vaccinated.

=== Medication supply ===
The pandemic created shortages of some medications since it began, initially related to panic buying. The most commonly used antidepressant in Australia, sertraline, is one of many such as the brand Zoloft, that have been affected by a global shortage. Olmesartan and irbesartan, both blood pressure medications were short in Australia as were hormone replacement therapy (HRT) patches and carbimazole, a thyroid medication. As of February 2021 the contraceptive pill "Norimin" (norethisterone) was hard for pharmacists to acquire, supply had been intermittent for 6–12 months. Shortages of Norimin and Ethinylestradiol/norethisterone, both Pfizer products, were reported in August 2020 and first predicted to last until December 2020, the shortage was then expected by the TGA "to be resolved in March or April 2021". In the case of sertraline a Serious Shortage Substitution Notice (SSSN) was issued by the Therapeutic Goods Administration (TGA). SSSNs were also issued in Australia for Prazosin (blood pressure), Metformin (diabetes), and Estrogen path (HRT), which in theory allows substitutions like issuing twice the number of 25-milligram (0.39 gr) tablets in place of the prescribed 50-milligram (0.77 gr) tablets, without a new prescription, but with the patients' consent. Chris Moy, Vice President of the Australian Medical Association (AMA) said medicine shortages in Australia were a "pre-existing problem" before COVID-19.

I think somewhere in the order of 89 percent of all day-to-day prescription medications are supplied from overseas; they often say 'patented in Australia' but they are actually made overseas.

— Chris Moy, Vice President of the AMA

Moy also said "A lot of our medications are made in China and India. Sovereign capability and protecting supply of our medications is something that should be seriously considered."

The TGA gave short-term approval for the import of some medicines that are "not on the Australian Register of Therapeutic Goods (ARTG) that are approved for import and supply in Australia because: there is a shortage of a medicine registered in Australia; and the medicine is needed in the interest of public health."

=== Politics ===
In 2020, local council elections were impacted by the pandemic. In Victoria candidates could only campaign online. NSW elections due in September were postponed a year.

In 2021, NSW local council elections due on 4 September, already postponed from 2020, were postponed again to 4 December due to a wave of Delta variant infections that caused numerous lockdowns in the state.

On 31 January 2021, Federal politicians flying into Canberra from Western Australia had to quarantine for five days when a sudden lockdown was declared in Perth and two adjoining regions. Federal Parliament was scheduled to resume on 2 February.

On 26 July 2021 it was announced that, from 2 August, Parliament House in Canberra would come under COVID-19 restrictions to "minimise non-essential activity" for the next legislative sitting that day. All public galleries were closed and the general public was unable to enter the building. The number of politicians attending, and their staff, was "substantially reduced" and remote participation technology was used. Physical distancing returned. Use of the Check-in CBR app was extended to all food and beverage venues open under takeaway only restrictions. The restrictions lasted until 3 September.

=== Protests ===
Throughout 2020 and 2021, several protests against COVID-19 lockdown restrictions were held in several state capitals including Adelaide, Brisbane, Melbourne, Perth and Sydney. In addition, protests were held in February 2021 against the Federal Government's national vaccine programme. Police responded to these protests by arresting demonstrators and issuing fines.

=== Sport ===
The major sporting leagues (A-League Men, AFL, AFL Women's, and the National Rugby League) initially stated that their 2020 seasons would not be suspended but would continue behind closed doors, with some games being played under those conditions. However, all the leagues were later suspended.

Athletics

Initially the 2020 Stawell Gift was postponed until later in the year; however, in May it was cancelled entirely for 2020.

Australian rules football

The 2020 AFL season was initially curtailed to a maximum of 17 games, with clubs expected to take at least a 10% revenue hit from coronavirus related issues. However, on 22 March, just before the end of round 1 of the 2020 season, AFL CEO Gillon McLachlan announced that the AFL season would be suspended until at least 31 May, citing the shutting of state borders as the primary cause for this decision. The AFL season restarted on 11 June, with the Grand Final being played on 24 October at the Gabba in Brisbane, Queensland, the first Grand Final to be held outside Victoria. The 2020 AFL Women's season was cancelled midway through the finals series, with no premiership awarded to any team.

Baseball

The 2020–2021 playoffs were shortened and the 2021–2022 season of the Australian Baseball League was cancelled due to travel restrictions and Victoria being in lockdown, respectively.

Basketball

The 2020 NBL Finals began with game two, although it was stated that the competition would be immediately suspended if any participants were to be diagnosed. The best of five series was subsequently cancelled after the third game was played with the title awarded to Perth Wildcats.

All second-tier state basketball leagues were either postponed or cancelled.

Cricket

The remaining two One Day Internationals between Australia and New Zealand in March 2020 were cancelled, and the first match was played without spectators. Cricket Australia also cancelled the Australian women's cricket team's tour of South Africa due to the virus.

Motorsports

The first major sporting event in Australia to be affected was the 2020 Australian Grand Prix, which was cancelled on 13 March 2020 after McLaren withdrew when a team member tested positive for COVID-19. This was also enforced on the support races which included the 2020 Melbourne 400, which was the second round of the 2020 Supercars Championship to be cancelled. The 2021 Australian Grand Prix was postponed from its original March date to November to allow for the easing of travel restrictions. On 6 July 2021, it was cancelled for the second consecutive year due to "restrictions and logistical challenges" related to the pandemic.

Rugby league

Following the implementation of travel restrictions by New Zealand, the Australian Rugby League Commission (ARLC) announced that the New Zealand Warriors would be based in Australia for the foreseeable future. The 2020 season was suspended indefinitely on 23 March. Chairman of the ARLC Peter V'landys requested a government bailout for the National Rugby League, a request that was struck down, and caused a considerable negative reaction.

On 22 April 2020, the NRL announced that they planned for the season to restart on 28 May, with training beginning on 4 May, and has planned for 18 rounds (giving a 20-round season) and a State of Origin series, with the Grand Final rescheduled for 25 October.

The NRL season recommenced on 28 May 2020 with a round 3 game played in Brisbane between the Brisbane Broncos and Parramatta Eels. The match was played behind closed doors without any crowd, although the broadcasters (Channel 9 and Fox Sports) used fake crowd noise during the broadcast. The return match rated highly on TV as it was the first TV match of a team sport in Australia for 8 weeks. The Grand Final was played in front of a limited crowd on 25 October at ANZ Stadium.

The 2020 State of Origin series took place after the NRL season, with Game 3 holding a capacity crowd at Brisbane's Suncorp Stadium.

Rugby union

The 2020 Super Rugby season was suspended following the conclusion of play on 15 March 2020, due to the outbreak and the imposition of mandatory quarantine for international travellers to New Zealand.

Soccer

In 2020, the A-League initially announced a continuation of the league with the Wellington Phoenix FC being based in Australia; however, on 24 March 2020, suspended the remaining matches indefinitely. On 17 July, the season resumed in a NSW-based hub, where the season finished with the Grand Final occurring at Bankwest Stadium on 30 August in front of a limited crowd.

Yacht racing

The 2020 Sydney to Hobart Yacht Race was cancelled on 19 December due to an outbreak in the Greater Sydney region.

=== Tourism ===
Economic modelling in May 2020 by Tourism Research Australia predicted that the domestic tourism industry would drop in value from A$138 billion to $83 billion.

== Travel restrictions ==
On 2 October 2020, Prime Minister Morrison announced that the Australian Government had formalised a deal allowing New Zealanders "one-way quarantine-free travel" into New South Wales and the Northern Territory from 16 October as part of initial steps to establish a "travel bubble" between the two countries. However, New Zealand Prime Minister Jacinda Ardern has ruled out extending reciprocal "quarantine-free travel" for Australians in order to contain the spread of COVID-19 into New Zealand.

On 17 October 2020, Stuff reported that 17 New Zealanders who had entered New South Wales traveled to Melbourne despite Victoria not being a party to the travel bubble arrangement with New Zealand. The Victorian Department of Health and Human Services confirmed the arrival of the group but stated that it did not have the authority to detain them. In response, Victorian Premier Daniel Andrews threatened to close his state's borders unless the Australian Federal Government blocked travellers using the Trans-Tasman bubble from traveling to Victoria. The Federal Government has disagreed with the Victorian Government's stance. In addition, New South Wales Premier Gladys Berejiklian announced that her government would not prevent New Zealand passengers from travelling to Victoria.

On 11 December 2020, the Premier of Queensland Annastacia Palaszczuk announced that her state would open its borders to travelers from New Zealand from 1:00 am the following day (12 December), exempting them from quarantine restrictions.

On 14 December 2020, the New Zealand Prime Minister Ardern announced that the New Zealand Government had approved plans to establish a quarantine free travel bubble with Australia in the first quarter of 2021. Australian Health Minister Greg Hunt welcomed the move, describing it as the "first step" in normalising international travel and reiterated the Australian Government's support for measures to establish the travel bubble.

On 25 January 2021, the Federal government immediately suspended the ability of New Zealanders to travel to Australia that they had since 16 October 2020, without quarantining, for at least 72 hours. This followed the discovery of a NZ resident with the SARS-CoV-2 Beta variant. The woman was not known to be infectious, having twice tested negative to COVID-19 before leaving quarantine, then visited many places in northern NZ, but she was then found to have the new strain.

On 19 April 2021, Australians were allowed quarantine-free travel to New Zealand for the first time in more than a year. To fly under the bubble's rules, passengers must have spent 14 days before departure in either Australia or New Zealand; however, they are not required to spend the full 14-day period or more in the other country, i.e. a person has spent at least 14 days in Australia, flies to New Zealand and returns to Australia after 7 days. They must not be awaiting the results of a COVID-19 test, nor have any COVID-19 symptoms, amongst other criteria.

== Geo-tracking app ==
In late August 2021, the state of South Australia launched an app with facial recognition software that Australians subject to mandatory 14-day quarantines could opt to use in lieu of being quarantined at a hotel under police guard. The app randomly prompted users to take a picture of their face and submit geo-location data within 15 minutes of the prompt to prove to the South Australian government that the user was in an approved location. Users who refuse to comply or who fail to respond to a prompt within 15 minutes are checked on by local police and may be subject to fines.

== Demand for investigation ==
On 19 April 2020, Australia questioned China's handling of the pandemic, questioned the transparency of its disclosures, and demanded an international investigation into the origins of the virus and its spread. The Chinese Ambassador Cheng Jingye, in a rare breach of diplomatic protocol, leaked details of his telephone conversation with Frances Adamson, Secretary of Department of Foreign Affairs and Trade, on the embassy website. He warned that the demand for an inquiry could result in a consumer boycott of students and tourists visiting Australia, and could affect sales of major exports. A trade dispute involving improperly labelled beef and barley dumping ensued, which seriously affected Australian exports. On 26 August 2020, China's deputy ambassador to Australia, Wang Xining, expressed that Australia's co-proposal for an independent investigation into the causes of the pandemic "hurts the feelings of the Chinese people" during his address to the National Press Club of Australia.

== Event cancellations ==
Numerous events in 2020 and 2021 were cancelled, rescheduled, postponed, reduced in size, or had their location changed. Some went to an online or streaming format. In 2021, events such as Skyfire, regional agricultural shows, and music festivals (Byron Bay Bluesfest and Groovin' the Moo) were cancelled for the second year. By 16 January 2021, twenty regional town shows scheduled for January or February 2021 had been postponed or cancelled in New South Wales alone. Many subsequent events were cancelled in 2021 and into early 2022 with the emergence of the Omicron variant.

- The World Surf League cancelled all events in March 2020.
- All Anzac Day marches in 2020 were cancelled. In 2021, most major state marches went ahead, some states as per pre-pandemic, but most with ticketing and/or restrictions on numbers marching and watching. Overseas services were not held. On 24 April 2021, Perth city and the Peel region entered a sudden 3-day COVID-19 lockdown, and Anzac Day services in the affected areas were cancelled.
- The Australian Border Force suspended all deportations to New Zealand between 16 and 30 March 2020.
- National Assessment Program – Literacy and Numeracy (NAPLAN) tests for 2020 were cancelled on 20 March.
- The national regional touring music festival Groovin' the Moo announced on 17 March that the 2020 festival was cancelled whilst confirming dates for 2021. On 4 February 2021, that year's festival was also "postponed".
- Many music events were cancelled, including tours by Jimmy Barnes, Harry Styles, and Rod Stewart. Other cancelled events include Full Tilt Adelaide, Grapevine Gathering, HomeBrewed Festival, and Rainbow Spirit Festival, with many more events postponed.

== Lawsuits ==
=== St Basil's Home for the Aged ===
One of Australia's deadliest aged-care COVID-19 outbreaks occurred at St Basil's Home for the Aged in Melbourne, killing 45 people. The facility was fined $150,000 by the County Court of Victoria after pleading guilty to a workplace safety charge relating to inadequate staff training during the 2020 outbreak, in which 45 residents died from COVID-related complications within a month. Judge Trevor Wraight described the breach as "relatively serious" while acknowledging that the organisation had implemented reforms in the years following the outbreak. The penalty provoked strong criticism from relatives of deceased residents, many of whom argued that the fine was disproportionately small given the scale of the loss of life.

== See also ==
- Timeline of the COVID-19 pandemic in Australia
- COVID-19 vaccination in Australia
- COVID-19 protests in Australia
- COVID-19 clusters in Australia
- COVID-19 pandemic by country and territory
- COVID-19 pandemic in Oceania
- COVID-19 pandemic in New Zealand
- Biosecurity in Australia
- National Cabinet (Australia)
- National COVID-19 Commission Advisory Board
- National Security Committee (Australia)
- Coronavirus Australia
- Xenophobia and racism related to the COVID-19 pandemic#Australia

=== State and territory articles ===
- COVID-19 pandemic in the Australian Capital Territory
- COVID-19 pandemic in New South Wales
- COVID-19 pandemic in the Northern Territory
- COVID-19 pandemic in Queensland
- COVID-19 pandemic in South Australia
- COVID-19 pandemic in Tasmania
- COVID-19 pandemic in Victoria
- COVID-19 pandemic in Western Australia
