= Quarantine Act 1908 =

Repealed Act of the Parliament of Australia

Parliament of Australia
- Long title: An Act relating to Quarantine
- Citation: No. 3 of 1908 or No. 3, 1908 as amended
- Territorial extent: States and territories of Australia
- Assented to: 30 March 1908

Repealed by
- Biosecurity Act 2015

Summary
- The Quarantine Act 1908 was the primary biosecurity and quarantine legislation of the Australian Commonwealth that has been repealed and replaced.
- Status: Repealed

The Quarantine Act 1908 (Cth) was an act of the Parliament of Australia which is no longer in effect. It was assented to on 30 March 1908. It was superseded by the Biosecurity Act 2015 and repealed on 16 June 2016.

== History ==
Australia imported livestock from several countries with livestock diseases in the 18th century and by the late 19th century, quarantine measures were implemented by the Australian colonies. Clause 51(ix) of the Australian Constitution empowered the federal government to make laws in relation to quarantine. In 1906, the state premiers agreed that the administration of quarantine be transferred to the Commonwealth Government and thus, two years later, the federal parliament enacted the Act, which provided a national approach to quarantine for the first time.

When the Act was passed, sea travel was the only way that people and goods could reach Australia, and the main concern was protecting the country from outbreaks of "quarantinable disease", such as the bubonic plague, yellow fever, smallpox, cholera and leprosy. The Act was amended more than 50 times in its 108 years of existence, as biosecurity risks in Australia changed over time, and the broader concept of biosecurity came to include "protection of the economy, environment and human health from negative impacts associated with entry, establishment or spread of exotic pests and diseases"; a more proactive approach. A number of reviews were undertaken, including the Nairn Report, and then 2008 Beale Review, a "comprehensive and independent review of Australia’s quarantine and biosecurity arrangements", which recommended new biosecurity legislation to replace the Quarantine Act.

This quarantine law affected the 1956 Summer Olympics in Australia. Due to restrictions on livestock importation, the equestrian events at those games had to be hosted in Stockholm, Sweden, rather than Australia.

== The Act ==
The Act at its last revision (Compilation No. 44, June 2016) provided for:

- Power to supersede quarantine measures under State Acts, "Whenever the Governor-General is satisfied that an emergency exists which makes it necessary to do so... And may at any time revoke or vary such proclamation". (Chapter 2A)
- The Governor-General to declare the existence of an epidemic. (Chapter 2B)
- The Governor-General to give authorisation to various people or agencies to coordinate a response to the epidemic. (Chapter 3)

It also specified the scope of "quarantine" and defined various terms used in the Act; administration arrangements, including arrangements with states and territories; the relationship with the Environment Protection and Biodiversity Conservation Act 1999 and the Environment Minister; general provisions; quarantining of vessels, persons, goods, animals and plants; monitoring and control; powers for enforcement of the Act, and a number of miscellaneous matters.

== Repeal and replacement ==
In 2015, the Biosecurity Act 2015 replaced most of the Act, which was wholly repealed on 16 June 2016 by the Biosecurity (Consequential Amendments and Transitional Provisions) Act 2015. The new Act was a major reform of the Quarantine Act, in particular in its strengthening and modernising the biosecurity legislation in Australia. New requirements included how the then Department of Agriculture and Water Resources would manage biosecurity risks associated with goods, people and vessels entering Australia.
