= COVID-19 clusters in Australia =

The following table outlines the COVID-19 clusters detected in Australia from the start of the pandemic until 5 November 2021, when Australia entered the consolidation phase of its COVID-19 transition plan by reaching an 80 percent vaccination target of the eligible Australian population. COVID-19 clusters are cases that are known to be related by close contacts. A single cluster may have cases in multiple locations. Some smaller clusters are known to be linked to larger clusters. A cluster may be investigated for days before being announced for the first time. The table may include clusters that originated after 5 November 2021, however, these are a narrow rather than a near-exhaustive subset of the total clusters in the Australian community.

The table uses a combination of reporting from official state and territory government publications as well as media sources where appropriate. Reporting from state and territory governments has varied depending on the severity of outbreaks, as larger periods of community transmission make it less practical to provide details on every outbreak. The Victorian Government did not report breakdowns of individual clusters on 10 July 2020 due to widespread community transmission becoming entrenched in the Melbourne metropolitan area. On 8 September 2020, the Victoria Government published numbers relating to all aged care clusters. The NSW Government significantly scaled down reporting of individual clusters on 10 July 2021 due to the widespread community transmission in the Sydney metropolitan area. Additionally, the Victorian government scaled down their daily reporting on individual clusters on 21 August 2021; as a result the highest concurrent active case numbers may be cited for some clusters in the absence of complete case numbers.

Furthermore, apart from instances that a cluster has particular notoriety, the table does not regularly report on clusters originating from jurisdictions once their government abandoned a COVID-zero target, as clusters became too numerous and their reporting became significantly less comprehensive. This occurred in New South Wales in mid-August 2021 and in Victoria on 1 September 2021. On 14 September 2021, while not officially abandoning a COVID-zero target, the ACT government conceded it was unlikely that COVID-19 would be eliminated from the territory.

COVID-19 clusters in Australia
Cluster	Location	State / Territory	Cases in cluster	From date	As at date	Details
Flemington public housing apartments	Flemington	Victoria	310 (Note: This is the combined figure for both outbreaks. The North Melbourne and Flemington clusters were last reported with separate figures on 5 July.)	4 July 2020	3 August 2020	
North Melbourne public housing outbreak	North Melbourne	Victoria	310	3 July 2020	3 August 2020	
Baptcare Wyndham Lodge	Werribee	Victoria	301	22 July 2020	10 October 2020	30 deaths have been associated with this cluster.
Bondi cluster	Bondi	New South Wales	285 (Note: NSW Health ceased reporting the number of cases directly linked to the Bondi index case on 10 July.)	19 June 2021	9 July 2021	
St Basil's Homes for the Aged	Fawkner	Victoria	250	15 July 2020	26 September 2020	45 deaths have been associated with this cluster.
Epping Gardens Aged Care	Epping	Victoria	240	21 July 2020	18 October 2020	38 deaths have been associated with this cluster.
Bertocchi Smallgoods	Thomastown	Victoria	211	23 July 2020	23 August 2020	
Al-Taqwa College, first outbreak	Truganina	Victoria	210	29 June 2020	18 August 2020	
The Argyle House	Newcastle	New South Wales	200	8 December 2021	14 December 2021	
Estia Health Aged Care, Ardeer	Ardeer	Victoria	197	14 July 2020	26 September 2020	17 deaths have been associated with this cluster.
Somerville Meats Retail Services	Tottenham	Victoria	167	11 July 2020	20 August 2020	
Royal Melbourne Hospital, first outbreak	Parkville	Victoria	164	21 June 2020	31 August 2020	
1st JBS abattoir outbreak	Brooklyn	Victoria	160	6 July 2020	29 August 2020	
Kirkbrae Presbyterian Homes	Kilsyth	Victoria	156	22 July 2020	4 October 2020	21 deaths have been associated with this cluster.
Avalon cluster	Avalon Beach	New South Wales	151	16 December 2020	11 January 2021	
BlueCross Ruckers Hill Aged Care Facility	Northcote	Victoria	147	5 September 2020	25 September 2020	12 deaths have been associated with this cluster.
Indooroopilly State High School outbreak	Indooroopilly	Queensland	146	31 July 2021	24 August 2021	Additional case reported in the media.
Shepparton Community Cluster	Shepparton	Victoria	143 (Note: The Victorian Government ceased providing a separate breakdown of this cluster on 4 September.)	21 August 2021	3 September 2021	Includes the Royal Melbourne Hospital, second outbreak. Additional cases reported in daily updates.
Twin Parks Aged Care Centre	Reservoir	Victoria	141	1 August 2020	24 September 2020	22 deaths have been associated with this cluster.
Outlook Gardens Aged Care	Dandenong North	Victoria	137	24 July 2020	16 September 2020	13 deaths have been associated with this cluster.
Cumberland Manor Aged Care Facility	Sunshine North	Victoria	132	17 August 2020	13 September 2020	11 deaths have been associated with this cluster.
Al-Taqwa College, second outbreak	Truganina	Victoria	132 (Note: Case numbers are based on the peak of active cases as daily reporting did not always provide a cluster breakdown. As a result, the total number of cases in this cluster may be higher.)	4 August 2021	21 August 2021	
Japara Goonawarra Aged Care Facility	Sunbury	Victoria	130	16 August 2020	19 October 2020	20 deaths have been associated with this cluster.
North West Regional Hospital (NWRH) and the North West Private Hospital (NWPH)	Burnie	Tasmania	127	27 March 2020	30 April 2020	Probably originating from two patients from the Ruby Princess cruise ship.
Estia Health Aged Care, Heidelberg	Heidelberg	Victoria	127	18 July 2020	25 October 2020	10 deaths have been associated with this cluster.
MyCentre Childcare	Broadmeadows	Victoria	127	20 August 2021	3 September 2021	
Kalyna Care Aged Care, Delahey	Delahey	Victoria	126	8 September 2020	1 November 2020	26 deaths have been associated with this cluster.
Mecwacare John Atchison Centre	Hoppers Crossing	Victoria	118	17 July 2020	14 September 2020	19 deaths have been associated with this cluster.
Thai Rock Restaurant, Wetherill Park	Wetherill Park	New South Wales	116	17 July 2020	12 August 2020	Includes at least 11 cases associated with Our Lady of Lebanon Church. This is currently not linked to the cluster at another Thai Rock restaurant in Potts Point.
Mercy Place Aged Care, Parkville	Parkville	Victoria	115	8 September 2020	19 October 2020	22 deaths have been associated with this cluster.
Aurrum Aged Care, Plenty	Plenty	Victoria	113	17 July 2020	14 September 2020	13 deaths have been associated with this cluster.
Glendale Aged Care Facility	Werribee	Victoria	113	8 July 2020	19 October 2020	17 deaths have been associated with this cluster.
Doutta Galla Aged Care, Yarraville	Yarraville	Victoria	113	8 September 2020	4 October 2020	17 deaths have been associated with this cluster.
Arcare Aged Care, Craigieburn	Craigieburn	Victoria	112	13 July 2020	5 November 2020	16 deaths have been associated with this cluster.
Cedar Meats meatworks	Brooklyn	Victoria	111	2 May 2020	22 May 2020	
CraigCare Aged Care Facility	Pascoe Vale	Victoria	111	26 July 2020	26 September 2020	16 deaths have been associated with this cluster.
BlueCross The Boulevard	Mill Park	Victoria	101	8 September 2020	19 October 2020	14 deaths have been associated with this cluster.
The Metro Theatre	Sydney	New South Wales	97	16 December 2021	16 December 2021	
Menarock Life Aged Care Rosehill	Highett	Victoria	96	8 September 2020	15 September 2020	17 deaths have been associated with this cluster.
Bupa Aged Care, Edithvale	Edithvale	Victoria	94	8 September 2020	4 October 2020	18 deaths have been associated with this cluster.
Princeton View Aged Care	Brighton East	Victoria	94	8 September 2020	27 September 2020	9 deaths have been associated with this cluster.
City of Hobsons Bay outbreak	City of Hobsons Bay	Victoria	93	5 August 2021	30 August 2021	This cluster was originally the parent cluster of the Al-Taqwa College second outbreak; the CS Square cluster in Caroline Springs and the Newport Football Club outbreak, which began being classified as their own separate clusters from 8 August. The cluster still encompasses among other outbreaks, the Newport community cluster.
Embracia Aged Care, Moonee Valley	Avondale Heights	Victoria	91	15 July 2020	19 October 2020	9 deaths have been associated with this cluster.
Frankston Hospital, Peninsula Health	Frankston	Victoria	90	24 August 2020	13 September 2020	
Royal Freemasons Gregory Lodge	Flemington	Victoria	89	8 September 2020	15 September 2020	15 deaths have been associated with this cluster.
Australian Lamb Company	Colac	Victoria	88	19 July 2020	28 August 2020	
Sutton Park McKenzie Aged Care, Melton South	Melton South	Victoria	87	8 September 2020	23 September 2020	7 deaths have been associated with this cluster.
Regis Aged Care, Brighton	Brighton	Victoria	86	24 July 2020	14 September 2020	11 deaths have been associated with this cluster.
Japara Elanora Aged Care	Brighton	Victoria	83	8 September 2020	19 October 2020	12 deaths have been associated with this cluster.
Glenlyn Aged Care Facility	Glenroy	Victoria	77	8 September 2020	14 September 2020	4 deaths have been associated with this cluster.
Multiple funeral and church services	Bankstown; Fairfield East; Rookwood; Mount Pritchard	New South Wales	76	24 July 2020	22 August 2020	Linked to a woman who attended five different funeral and church services in these suburbs between 16 and 19 July. This includes at least 15 cases associated with the Mounties Club in Mount Pritchard.
St Georges Benetas Organisation Aged Care Facility	Altona Meadows	Victoria	76	8 September 2020	19 October 2020	12 deaths have been associated with this cluster.
Jewish Care Hannah and Daryl Cohen Centre Windsor Aged Care Facility	Windsor	Victoria	75	8 September 2020	23 September 2020	2 deaths have been associated with this cluster.
Parklea Correctional Centre	Parklea	New South Wales	75	18 August 2021	31 August 2021	
Grace Of Mary Greek Cypriot Elderly Hostel	Epping	Victoria	72	8 September 2020	21 September 2020	12 deaths have been associated with this cluster.
Anglicare Newmarch House	Kingswood	New South Wales	71	11 April 2020	19 May 2020	34 staff and 37 residents infected as at 19 May 2020. 19 residents died.
Doutta Galla Aged Care, Footscray	Footscray	Victoria	71	8 September 2020	14 September 2020	9 deaths have been associated with this cluster.
Sydney CBD cluster	Sydney	New South Wales	69	26 August 2020	11 September 2020	First reported case at the City Tattersalls Club gym
Menarock Life Aged Care, Essendon	Essendon	Victoria	69	9 July 2020	8 September 2020	7 deaths have been associated with this cluster.
Carlton public housing towers	Carlton	Victoria	68	12 July 2020	4 August 2020	
Opal South Valley, Highton	Highton	Victoria	65	8 September 2020	18 September 2020	8 deaths have been associated with this cluster.
Linfox Distribution Centre / Warehouse	Truganina	Victoria	65	12 July 2020	21 August 2020	
Arcare Aged Care, Sydenham	Sydenham	Victoria	65	8 September 2020	28 September 2020	6 deaths have been associated with this cluster.
Woolworths Distribution Centre	Mulgrave	Victoria	64	18 July 2020	18 August 2020	
Vawdrey Australia	Dandenong South	Victoria	64	23 August 2020	16 September 2020	
Doutta Galla Aged Service Woornack	Sunshine	Victoria	64	8 September 2020	27 September 2020	8 deaths have been associated with this cluster.
BlueCross Autumdale	Cheltenham	Victoria	60	8 September 2020	14 September 2020	13 deaths have been associated with this cluster.
Crossroads Hotel	Casula	New South Wales	58	10 July 2020	2 August 2020	
Golden Farms Poultry	Breakwater	Victoria	55	31 July 2020	21 August 2020	
Estia Health Aged Care, Keilor second outbreak	Keilor	Victoria	55	15 September 2020	28 October 2020	6 deaths have been associated with this cluster.
Japara Central Park Aged Care	Windsor	Victoria	53	13 July 2020	23 September 2020	3 deaths have been associated with this cluster.
Glenroy West Primary School	Glenroy	Victoria	53	12 August 2021	25 August 2021	
Meriton Suites party	Waterloo	New South Wales	50	26 June 2021	12 July 2021	
Ms. Frankie Restaurant cluster	Cremorne	Victoria	50	18 July 2021	1 August 2021	Additional cases reported in daily updates.
City of Wyndham community cluster	City of Wyndham	Victoria	49	28 August 2021	1 September 2021	
Brisbane Youth Detention Centre	Wacol	Queensland	48	22 August 2020	12 September 2020	This includes at least 18 cases linked to the Queensland Corrective Services (QCS) Academy also in Wacol and at least 7 cases linked to the Ipswich Hospital.
Florence Aged Care Facility, Altona North	Altona North	Victoria	48	8 September 2020	14 September 2020	8 deaths have been associated with this cluster.
Japara Millward Residential Aged Care	Doncaster East	Victoria	48	8 September 2020	19 October 2020	4 deaths have been associated with this cluster.
Nino Early Learning Adventures	Bundoora	Victoria	46	30 July 2020	19 August 2020	
Casey community outbreak	City of Casey	Victoria	45	17 September 2020	30 September 2020	
Japara the Regent Aged Care Home	Mount Waverley	Victoria	45	8 September 2020	21 September 2020	3 deaths have been associated with this cluster.
West Hoxton birthday party	West Hoxton	New South Wales	45	23 June 2021	5 July 2021	
Catholic Regional College	Sydenham	Victoria	44	25 July 2020	18 August 2020	
Opal Hobsons Bay	Altona North	Victoria	44	14 September 2020	30 October 2020	9 deaths have been associated with this cluster.
Stamford Plaza Hotel	Little Collins Street, Melbourne	Victoria	43	17 June 2020	8 July 2020	Hotel was used to quarantine overseas travellers, however, the outbreak is connected to the security staff, not those quarantined.
Clever Kids Childcare	Ashburton	Victoria	43	18 July 2020	20 August 2020	
Lyneham High School	Lyneham	Australian Capital Territory	41	9 August 2021	26 August 2021	
North Metro Region community	Northern Melbourne suburbs	Victoria	42	19 October 2020	29 October 2020	
CS Square Shopping Centre	Caroline Springs	Victoria	41 (Note: May be understated due to incomplete reporting on 22 August.)	7 August 2021	27 August 2021	Additional cases reported in daily updates.
Two separate clusters including Lyndoch Hill winery	Barossa Valley	South Australia	40	14 March 2020	9 April 2020	
Hazeldean Transition Care, Western Health	Williamstown	Victoria	40	30 July 2020	29 August 2020	
BlueCross Westgarth	Northcote	Victoria	40	8 September 2020	18 September 2020	6 deaths have been associated with this cluster.
Norwood cluster	Norwood	South Australia	40	27 November 2021	15 December 2021	
Village Glen Aged Care Residences, Mornington	Mornington	Victoria	39	8 September 2020	8 September 2020	5 deaths have been associated with this cluster.
Chadstone Shopping Centre	Chadstone	Victoria	39	1 October 2020	20 October 2020	First case linked to The Butcher Club.
Thai Rock Restaurant, Potts Point	Potts Point	New South Wales	38	26 July 2020	23 August 2020	This includes at least 29 cases that are linked to the Apollo Restaurant. This is currently not linked to the cluster at another Thai Rock restaurant in Wetherill Park.
Hazeldene's Chicken Farm	Bendigo	Victoria	37	9 August 2020	21 August 2020	
Liverpool Hospital second outbreak	Liverpool	New South Wales	36 (Note: Case numbers may be underestimated as NSW Health do not provide regular updates of case numbers for this outbreak.)	26 July 2021	10 August 2021	Eleven deaths have been associated with this cluster.
Fitzroy St Precinct, St Kilda	St Kilda	Victoria	36	18 August 2021	24 August 2021	
Werribee Mercy Hospital	Werribee	Victoria	35	8 August 2020	23 August 2020	
Ausfresh	Broadmeadows	Victoria	35	1 August 2020	23 August 2020	
"Boogie Wonderland" party at the Bucket List and "Kode" party at Club 77	Bondi	New South Wales	34	15 March 2020	15 April 2020	
Inghams	Thomastown	Victoria	34	4 August 2020	19 August 2020	
Southern Cross Basketball Stadium	Tuggeranong	Australian Capital Territory	34	11 August 2021	26 August 2021	
Adelaide Airport baggage handling area	Adelaide Airport	South Australia	33	17 March 2020	9 April 2020	
Respite Services Australia	Moonee Ponds	Victoria	33	24 July 2020	8 August 2020	
Diamond Valley Pork	Laverton North	Victoria	33	26 July 2020	25 August 2020	
Estia Health Aged Care, Keysborough	Keysborough	Victoria	33	8 September 2020	19 September 2020	3 deaths have been associated with this cluster.
Parafield cluster	Parafield Gardens	South Australia	33	15 November 2020	28 November 2020	
Fiction Nightclub	Canberra	Australian Capital Territory	33	7 August 2021	26 August 2021	
LaManna Supermarket	Essendon Fields	Victoria	32	12 July 2020	2 August 2020	
City of Whittlesea community outbreak	City of Whittlesea	Victoria	32	24 May 2021	8 June 2021	
Port Melbourne workplace outbreak	Port Melbourne	Victoria	32	27 May 2021	9 June 2021	
Woolworths Millers Junction	Altona North	Victoria	32	29 August 2021	3 September 2021	
Stanwell Tops wedding	Wollongong	New South Wales	31	16 March 2020	19 March 2020	
Brunswick Private Hospital	Brunswick	Victoria	31	8 July 2020	16 August 2020	
Northern Hospital	Epping	Victoria	31	3 July 2020	17 August 2020	
Trinity Grammar outbreak	Kew	Victoria	31	18 July 2021	30 July 2021	Additional cases reported in daily updates.
St Vincent's Hospital	Fitzroy	Victoria	30	17 July 2020	3 August 2020	
Bingo Recycling	West Melbourne	Victoria	30	25 July 2020	17 August 2020	
Coles distribution centre	Laverton	Victoria	28	23 June 2020	21 August 2020	
BWS liquor cluster	Berala	New South Wales	28	2 January 2021	13 January 2021	
Lyfe Café	Bondi Beach	New South Wales	28	30 June 2021	2 July 2021	
Black Rock restaurant outbreak	Black Rock	Victoria	27	1 January 2021	5 January 2021	Also known as the Mitcham and Mentone communities outbreak. Believed to have originated from the Avalon cluster in NSW.
Great Ocean Foods	Marrickville	New South Wales	27	26 June 2021	4 July 2021	
Melbourne CBD/Carlton/North Melbourne cluster	City of Melbourne	Victoria	27	24 August 2021	24 August 2021	
Multiplex Premier Tower construction site	Melbourne	Victoria	26	10 August 2020	11 August 2020	
Tangara School for Girls	Cherrybrook	New South Wales	26	9 August 2020	22 August 2020	
Rose of Sharon Childcare	Blacktown	New South Wales	25	30 March 2020	4 April 2020	
Mercy Place Aged Care, Dandenong	Dandenong	Victoria	25	8 September 2020	8 September 2020	3 deaths have been associated with this cluster.
Oran Park community cluster	Oran Park	New South Wales	25	17 October 2020	27 October 2020	
Portuguese Family Centre cluster	Ellen Grove	Queensland	25	20 June 2021	8 July 2021	Includes the downstream Greek Orthodox Community Centre cluster. Two further cases, reported on 8 July, were close contacts of a case from the Greek Orthodox Community Centre cluster.
Churches of Christ Care Arcadia Aged Care	Essendon	Victoria	24	8 September 2020	23 September 2020	4 deaths have been associated with this cluster.
Holiday Inn Melbourne Airport outbreak	Melbourne Airport	Victoria	24	10 February 2021	26 February 2021	
Bupa Aged Care, Traralgon	Traralgon	Victoria	23	8 September 2020	14 September 2020	2 deaths have been associated with this cluster.
Edenvale Manor Aged Care Facility	Keilor East	Victoria	23	14 September 2020	30 September 2020	4 deaths have been associated with this cluster.
Baptcare Brookview Community	Westmeadows	Victoria	23	8 September 2020	19 October 2020	1 death has been associated with this cluster.
AAMI Park cluster	Melbourne	Victoria	23	18 July 2021	2 August 2021	Additional cases reported in daily updates.
Modbury cluster	Modbury	South Australia	22	19 July 2021	4 August 2021	
Dorothy Henderson Lodge	Macquarie Park	New South Wales	21	24 February 2020	15 April 2020	
Jayco	Dandenong South	Victoria	21	8 August 2020	15 August 2020	
Austin Hospital	Heidelberg	Victoria	21	16 August 2020	16 August 2020	
Concord Repatriation General Hospital and Liverpool Hospital (first outbreak)	Concord; Liverpool	New South Wales	21	7 September 2020	17 September 2020	First case reported in a health care worker who worked shifts at both hospitals whilst infectious.
Villa Maria Catholic Homes St Bernadette's	Sunshine North	Victoria	21	8 September 2020	18 September 2020	3 deaths have been associated with this cluster.
Newport football club outbreak	Newport	Victoria	21	7 August 2021	21 August 2021	
Regents Park Christian School	Regents Park	New South Wales	21	3 December 2021	8 December 2021	Also linked to the Sydney Indoor Climbing Gym in Villawood, St Peter Chanel Catholic Primary School in Regents Park, and one case in the ACT.
Footscray Hospital	Footscray	Victoria	20	15 September 2020	26 September 2020	
Al Kuwait live export ship	Fremantle Port	Western Australia	20	25 May 2020	29 May 2020	
Bulla Dairy Foods	Colac	Victoria	20	6 September 2020	13 September 2020	
Wyoming Residential Aged Care Facility	Summer Hill	New South Wales	20	29 July 2021	3 August 2021	Four deaths associated with this cluster.
St Kilda East community outbreak	St Kilda	Victoria	20	16 August 2021	28 August 2021	
Royal Melbourne Hospital, second outbreak	Parkville	Victoria	20	23 August 2021	1 September 2021	
Church meeting	Ryde	New South Wales	19	8 March 2020	15 April 2020	
Serco, Mill Park	Mill Park	Victoria	19	18 July 2020	2 August 2020	
St Vincent's Private Hospital Melbourne	Unspecified	Victoria	19	3 September 2020	3 September 2020	
The Granites gold mine	Tanami Desert	Northern Territory	19	25 June 2021	8 July 2021	Nineteen cases include 17 cases recorded up to 3 July.
Bacchus Marsh Grammar School	Maddingley	Victoria	19	15 July 2021	30 July 2021	Additional cases reported in daily updates.
City of Hume outbreak	City of Hume	Victoria	19	15 July 2021	3 August 2021	Also known as the Coolaroo cluster. Additional cases reported in daily updates.
Dowell Windows	Bayswater	Victoria	18	31 July 2020	1 August 2020	
Caroline Chisholm Catholic College	Braybrook	Victoria	18	12 August 2020	12 August 2020	
St Pauls Catholic College	Greystanes	New South Wales	18	1 September 2020	13 September 2020	
Dandenong Police Station	Dandenong	Victoria	18	7 September 2020	23 September 2020	
Bupa Aged Care, Templestowe	Templestowe	Victoria	18	8 September 2020	14 September 2020	2 deaths have been associated with this cluster.
The Sails Restaurant	Noosa Heads	Queensland	17	14 March 2020	26 March 2020	
Wollert outbreak	Wollert	Victoria	17	24 June 2020	4 July 2020	This cluster was first detected at St Monica's College, Epping.
Docklands Studios Melbourne	Docklands	Victoria	17	25 August 2020	26 August 2020	
Patricia Oldendorff vessel	Port of Port Hedland	Western Australia	17	26 September 2020	29 September 2020	
A2Z Medical Clinic	Lakemba	New South Wales	17	13 October 2020	28 October 2020	
Rydges on Swanston	Swanston Street, Carlton	Victoria	16	27 May 2020	13 June 2020	This is one of the hotels in which overseas travellers are quarantined. This outbreak is connected to the security staff, not those quarantined. On 6 June, a man who was a close contact of this cluster was announced as a new case in Queensland, having travelled to Brisbane on 1 June, then to Bundaberg on 2 June.
The Alfred Hospital first outbreak	Melbourne	Victoria	16	6 July 2020	16 July 2020	
St Joseph's Primary School	Quarry Hill, Bendigo	Victoria	16	11 August 2020	11 August 2020	
Wydinia Kindergarten	Colac	Victoria	16	12 September 2020	16 September 2020	
Young & Jackson Hotel	Melbourne	Victoria	16	16 July 2021	3 August 2021	Additional cases reported in daily updates.
Maroubra gathering	Maroubra	New South Wales	16	21 August 2021	21 August 2021	
Albanvale Primary School	Albanvale	Victoria	15	20 June 2020	3 July 2020	
Box Hill Hospital second outbreak	Box Hill	Victoria	15	8 October 2020	23 October 2020	
North Melbourne Primary School outbreak / West Melbourne outbreak	North Melbourne; West Melbourne	Victoria	15	3 June 2021	8 June 2021	
Lennock Car Dealership	Philip	Australian Capital Territory	15	17 August 2021	26 August 2021	
Bondi Hardware Restaurant	Bondi	New South Wales	14	15 March 2020	15 April 2020	
Arcare Aged Care, Maidstone first outbreak	Maidstone	Victoria	14	14 September 2020	19 October 2020	
Joh Bailey Hair Salon	Double Bay	New South Wales	14	24 June 2021	2 July 2021	
MCG Melbourne Cricket Club Members' Reserve	East Melbourne	Victoria	14	15 July 2021	22 July 2021	
Assembly Bar	Braddon	Australian Capital Territory	14	8 August 2021	26 August 2021	
Sunnybank cluster	Sunnybank	Queensland	14	11 September 2021	25 September 2021	Additional cases reported in the media.
McDonald's, Fawkner	Fawkner	Victoria	13	9 May 2020	7 June 2020	On 7 June, a new case was announced. There had been no increase since 18 May 20 days before.
Goodman Fielder Pampas	West Footscray	Victoria	13	14 July 2020	20 July 2020	
Bluebird Early Education	South Morang	Victoria	13	9 August 2020	9 August 2020	
Liverpool private clinic cluster	Liverpool	New South Wales	13	9 October 2020	22 October 2020	
Downer Community Centre	Downer	Australian Capital Territory	13	8 August 2021	26 August 2021	
Deer Park gathering	Deer Park	Victoria	12	4 July 2020	4 July 2020	
Western Health	Unspecified	Victoria	12	17 July 2020	17 July 2020	
The Alfred Hospital second outbreak	Melbourne	Victoria	12	19 September 2020	3 October 2020	
Princess Alexandra Hospital nurse cluster / Byron Bay Hen's Party	Woolloongabba / Byron Bay	Queensland / New South Wales	12	30 March 2021	1 April 2021	This cluster is believed to not be connected to the other ongoing cluster at the same hospital. This cluster is also linked to a Hen's Party held in Byron Bay, New South Wales.
Southbank outbreak	Southbank	Victoria	12	21 June 2021	26 June 2021	
Crossways Hotel	Strathfield South	New South Wales	12	30 June 2021	2 July 2021	
St Patricks Primary School	Murrumbeena	Victoria	12	21 July 2021	28 July 2021	Additional cases reported in daily updates.
KFC, Punchbowl	Punchbowl	New South Wales	12	27 July 2021	6 August 2021	
MV Stolt Sakura	Fremantle Port	Western Australia	12	3 October 2021	4 October 2021	
My Moovers call centre	Docklands	Victoria	11	31 July 2020	31 July 2020	
Batemans Bay Soldiers Club	Batemans Bay	New South Wales	11	19 July 2020	12 August 2020	
Allied Pinnacle Bakery	Altona North	Victoria	11	8 August 2020	16 August 2020	
Estia Health Aged Care, Glen Waverley	Glen Waverley	Victoria	11	8 September 2020	14 September 2020	
Menarock Life Aged Care McGregor Gardens	Pakenham	Victoria	11	8 September 2020	8 September 2020	
Inner West / Croydon cluster	Croydon	New South Wales	11	30 December 2020	8 January 2021	
Arcare Aged Care, Maidstone second outbreak	Maidstone	Victoria	11	30 May 2021	13 June 2021	
SummitCare, Baulkham Hills	Baulkham Hills	New South Wales	11	4 July 2021	8 July 2021	
Bright Bees Early Learning	Nicholls	Australian Capital Territory	11	8 August 2021	26 August 2021	
Aviation trainer cluster	Eatons Hill	Queensland	11	28 September 2021	5 October 2021	First case detected was an Eatons Hill resident who works in an aviation training facility. Additional cases reported in the media.
Aitken Hill Primary	Craigieburn	Victoria	10	29 June 2020	7 July 2020	
StarTrack	Laverton	Victoria	10	25 July 2020	25 July 2020	
Don KR Castlemaine	Castlemaine	Victoria	10	24 July 2020	28 July 2020	
Aruma Disability Services	Pascoe Vale	Victoria	10	28 July 2020	28 July 2020	
Rathdowne Place Aged Care	Carlton	Victoria	10	8 September 2020	14 September 2020	
Hoxton Park cluster	Hoxton Park	New South Wales	10	31 October 2020	4 November 2020	
BBC California Vessel	Fremantle Port	Western Australia	10	19 July 2021	20 July 2021	
Nepean Mental Health Centre	Kingswood	New South Wales	10	12 August 2021	12 August 2021	
Cenvic Construction Riverina Apartments	Footscray	Victoria	9	11 July 2020	14 July 2020	
Melbourne City Mission, Albion	Albion	Victoria	9	21 July 2020	21 July 2020	
AMSSA	North Melbourne	Victoria	9	24 July 2020	24 July 2020	
Blackwoods	Scoresby	Victoria	9	29 July 2020	29 July 2020	
Maculata Place Shepparton Village Aged Care	Shepparton	Victoria	9	8 September 2020	8 September 2020	
Eastern Suburbs Legion Club	Waverley	New South Wales	9	17 September 2020	17 September 2020	
South Eastern community outbreak	South Eastern Melbourne suburbs	Victoria	9	13 October 2020	14 October 2020	
Bondi Junction apartment block outbreak	Bondi Junction	New South Wales	9	10 July 2021	13 July 2021	
Fairfield Hospital; Royal North Shore Hospital	Prairiewood; St Leonards	New South Wales	9	1 July 2021	2 July 2021	A student nurse worked while infectious from 24 to 28 June.
MV Darya Krishna	Fremantle Port	Western Australia	9	26 July 2021	29 July 2021	
Hugo Boss store	Collins Street, Melbourne	Victoria	8	30 June 2020	9 July 2020	
Marley Spoon packaging and distribution facility	Altona North	Victoria	8	10 August 2020	10 August 2020	
Assisi Centre Aged Care	Rosanna	Victoria	8	8 September 2020	14 September 2020	
Villa Maria Catholic Homes Aged Care Residence, Berwick	Berwick	Victoria	8	8 September 2020	8 September 2020	
James Barker House Aged Care	Footscray	Victoria	8	2 August 2020	8 September 2020	
Springvale shared accommodation	Springvale	Victoria	8	25 September 2020	2 October 2020	
Princess Alexandra Hospital doctor cluster	Woolloongabba	Queensland	8	26 March 2021	1 April 2021	The first case of this cluster was detected on 12 March, with the second case of this cluster being detected 13 days later on 25 March through genomic testing.
Phillip Island cluster	Phillip Island	Victoria	8	18 July 2021	23 July 2021	Additional case reported on 23 July.
Moonee Valley Racecourse testing site	Moonee Ponds	Victoria	8	28 July 2021	5 August 2021	Additional cases reported in daily updates and in the media.
City of Maribyrnong outbreak	City of Maribyrnong	Victoria	8	5 August 2021	7 August 2021	Additional cases reported in daily updates.
Mount Alexander College	Flemington	Victoria	8	10 August 2021	11 August 2021	
Lygon Street Housing Tower outbreak	Carlton	Victoria	8	16 August 2021	20 August 2021	Additional cases reported in daily updates.
Catch.com Distribution Centre	Truganina	Victoria	7	9 July 2020	11 July 2020	
Fresh Plus	Craigieburn	Victoria	7	26 July 2020	26 July 2020	
2nd JBS abattoir outbreak	Brooklyn	Victoria	7	9 August 2020	9 August 2020	
Our Lady of Mercy College, Parramatta	Parramatta	New South Wales	7	14 August 2020	25 August 2020	
BlueCross Aged Care, Ivanhoe	Ivanhoe	Victoria	7	8 September 2020	14 September 2020	
Arcare Aged Care, Burnside	Burnside	Victoria	7	8 September 2020	8 September 2020	
Bupa Aged Care, Woodend	Woodend	Victoria	7	14 September 2020	14 September 2020	
Ariele Apartments outbreak	Maribyrnong	Victoria	7	15 July 2021	15 July 2021	
Central Park Pizza	Malvern East	Victoria	7	19 August 2021	20 August 2021	
Belconnen Basketball Stadium	Belconnen	Australian Capital Territory	7	17 August 2021	26 August 2021	
Opal Aged Care, Bankstown	Bankstown	New South Wales	6	25 March 2020	15 April 2020	
HWL Ebsworth Lawyers	Melbourne	Victoria	6	16 July 2020	16 July 2020	
Warringal Hospital	Heidelberg	Victoria	6	18 July 2020	19 July 2020	
Malmsbury Youth Justice Centre	Malmsbury	Victoria	6	24 July 2020	24 July 2020	
Parkville Youth Justice	Parkville	Victoria	6	27 July 2020	27 July 2020	
Centrelink office	Epping	Victoria	6	31 July 2020	31 July 2020	
Capral Aluminium	Campbellfield	Victoria	6	31 July 2020	31 July 2020	
Aurrum Aged Care, Reservoir	Reservoir	Victoria	6	8 September 2020	8 September 2020	
Electra Park Medical Centre	Ashwood	Victoria	6	4 October 2020	4 October 2020	
Oddfellows Café	Kilmore	Victoria	6	9 October 2020	10 October 2020	
Hotel Grand Chancellor	Spring Hill	Queensland	6	11 January 2021	13 January 2021	Hotel used for mandatory quarantining of returning travellers. These cases are infected with the Variant of Concern 202012/01 from the United Kingdom and have spread to a cleaner from the hotel (and her partner) and another pair of returning travellers in the same hotel.
BlueCross Chelsea Manor	Chelsea	Victoria	6	8 September 2020	8 September 2020	
Mercy Place Aged Care, Werribee	Werribee	Victoria	6	8 September 2020	8 September 2020	1 death has been associated with this cluster.
Northern suburbs cluster	Perth	Western Australia	6	27 June 2021	4 July 2021	
Optus head office	Melbourne	Victoria	5	4 July 2020	4 July 2020	
Sunshine Hospital, Western Health first outbreak	St Albans	Victoria	5	18 May 2020	9 July 2020	
Croydon Family Practice	Croydon	Victoria	5	13 June 2020	18 June 2020	
Debney Meadows Primary School	Flemington	Victoria	5	4 July 2020	11 July 2020	
Steel Mains	Somerton	Victoria	5	15 July 2020	15 July 2020	
Australian Pharmaceutical Industries	Dandenong South	Victoria	5	19 July 2020	20 July 2020	
KFC, Truganina	Truganina	Victoria	5	25 July 2020	25 July 2020	
Probe Group	Melbourne	Victoria	5	25 July 2020	25 July 2020	
Laverton Cold Storage	Truganina	Victoria	5	28 July 2020	28 July 2020	
Victoria Police sites	Docklands	Victoria	5	31 July 2020	31 July 2020	
Thebarton Senior College	Torrensville	South Australia	5	6 August 2020	6 August 2020	
Chopstix Asian Cuisine, Smithfield RSL	Smithfield	New South Wales	5	17 August 2020	17 August 2020	
Doutta Galla Lynch's Bridge	Kensington	Victoria	5	8 September 2020	8 September 2020	
Bupa Aged Care, Sunshine	Sunshine	Victoria	5	8 September 2020	8 September 2020	
Bill Crawford Lodge	Ballarat Central	Victoria	5	8 September 2020	8 September 2020	
Estia Health Aged Care, Keilor first outbreak	Keilor	Victoria	5	8 September 2020	16 September 2020	
Little Sisters of the Poor	Northcote	Victoria	5	8 September 2020	16 September 2020	
Regis Aged Care, Fawkner	Fawkner	Victoria	5	8 September 2020	14 September 2020	1 death has been associated with this cluster.
Uniting AgeWell, Preston	Preston	Victoria	5	11 October 2020	15 October 2020	
Zeus Street restaurant cluster	Chermside	Queensland	5	3 July 2021	7 July 2021	Originating from a Prince Charles Hospital worker in the second of two outbreaks at the hospital in the late June/early July 2021 period.
Mildura outbreak	Mildura	Victoria	5	18 July 2021	28 July 2021	Additional case reported on 28 July.
West Gate Tunnel workplace outbreak	West Gate Tunnel	Victoria	4	21 July 2021	25 July 2021	Additional cases reported in daily updates.
Camberwell Grammar School	Camberwell	Victoria	4	20 June 2020	6 July 2020	
Woolworths Online Fulfillment Centre	Footscray	Victoria	4	6 July 2020	8 July 2020	
Waste Equipment and Hiab Services	Ardeer	Victoria	4	15 July 2020	15 July 2020	
TD Cabinets	Dandenong South	Victoria	4	15 July 2020	15 July 2020	
Nestlé, Campbellfield	Campbellfield	Victoria	4	20 July 2020	20 July 2020	
Royal Children's Hospital	Parkville	Victoria	4	27 July 2020	27 July 2020	
Eastern Health	Unspecified	Victoria	4	7 August 2020	7 August 2020	
Knox International	Brooklyn	Victoria	4	9 August 2020	9 August 2020	
PGG Wrightson Seeds	Truganina	Victoria	4	9 August 2020	9 August 2020	
Elwood community	Elwood	Victoria	4	15 October 2020	15 October 2020	
Hoppers Crossing community outbreak	Hoppers Crossing	Victoria	4	19 October 2020	19 October 2020	
Christo's Pizzeria	Paddington	New South Wales	4	24 June 2021	30 June 2021	
South Coogee Public School	South Coogee	New South Wales	4	28 June 2021	28 June 2021	
Beenleigh cluster	Beenleigh	Queensland	4	2 September 2021	9 September 2021	Outbreak initiated by an infected truck driver returning from NSW. Additional cases reported in the media.
Goondiwindi cluster	Goondiwindi	Queensland	4	4 November 2021	6 November 2021	Cluster is linked to a known cluster in Moree, in northern NSW.
Katherine outbreak, initial cluster	Katherine	Northern Territory	4	4 November 2021	9 November 2021	The cluster represents Northern Territory's first confirmed case of community transmission. The cluster is genomically linked to the wider Northern Territory outbreak that was first detected on November 15.
Hampstead Dental	Maidstone	Victoria	3	20 June 2020	24 June 2020	
Springside Primary School	Caroline Springs	Victoria	3	20 June 2020	2 July 2020	
Orygen Youth Health facility	Footscray	Victoria	3	26 June 2020	3 July 2020	
Villa Bambini	Essendon	Victoria	3	2 July 2020	3 July 2020	
PM Fresh facility	Broadmeadows	Victoria	3	8 July 2020	11 July 2020	
Ilim College	Dallas	Victoria	3	11 July 2020	11 July 2020	
Bell Collision Repair Centre	Preston	Victoria	3	15 July 2020	15 July 2020	
Dairy Country	Tullamarine	Victoria	3	19 July 2020	19 July 2020	
Sims Metal Management	Brooklyn	Victoria	3	24 July 2020	24 July 2020	
Base Backpackers	St Kilda	Victoria	3	26 July 2020	26 July 2020	
Impact English College	Melbourne	Victoria	3	24 July 2020	26 July 2020	
Staines Memorial College	Redback Plains	Queensland	3	1 September 2020	2 September 2020	
Sunshine Hospital, Western Health second outbreak	St Albans	Victoria	3	3 October 2020	3 October 2020	
iMedic iCare Medical Center	Fairfield	New South Wales	3	12 July 2021	12 July 2021	
Keilor Downs Secondary College	Keilor Downs	Victoria	2	21 June 2020	24 June 2020	
Ascot Vale Primary School	Ascot Vale	Victoria	2	28 June 2020	4 July 2020	
StarTrack facility	Tullamarine	Victoria	2	30 June 2020	30 June 2020	
Moreland Primary School	Coburg	Victoria	2	30 June 2020	30 June 2020	
Maple Early Learning Centre	Mernda	Victoria	2	1 July 2020	1 July 2020	
Joan Kirner Women's and Children's Hospital	St Albans	Victoria	2	1 July 2020	5 July 2020	
Preston Market	Preston	Victoria	2	4 July 2020	4 July 2020	
Box Hill Hospital first outbreak	Box Hill	Victoria	2	12 July 2020	12 July 2020	
Mercy Hospital for Women	Heidelberg	Victoria	2	17 July 2020	17 July 2020	
Kmart, Endeavour Hills	Endeavour Hills	Victoria	2	17 July 2020	17 July 2020	
Serco, Box Hill	Box Hill	Victoria	2	18 July 2020	18 July 2020	
Grand Chancellor Hotel	Melbourne	Victoria	2	25 July 2020	25 July 2020	
D'Orsogna Meats	Mickleham	Victoria	2	25 July 2020	25 July 2020	
Uniting AgeWell, Kingsville	Kingsville	Victoria	2	1 August 2020	1 August 2020	
Polytrade Recycling	Dandenong South	Victoria	2	7 August 2020	7 August 2020	
Ballarat Health Services	Ballarat	Victoria	2	8 August 2020	8 August 2020	
Ambassador Hotel	Frankston	Victoria	2	8 August 2020	8 August 2020	
Dooleys Lidcombe Catholic Club	Lidcombe	New South Wales	2	14 August 2020	14 August 2020	
Prince Charles Hospital	Chermside	Queensland	2	29 June 2021	1 July 2021	First of two Prince Charles Hospital outbreaks detected in the late June/early July 2021 period.
Brisbane International Airport outbreak	Brisbane Airport	Queensland	2	1 July 2021	2 July 2021	
Commonwealth Bank, Roselands Shopping Centre	Roselands	New South Wales	2	7 July 2021	7 July 2021	
Canberra Institute of Technology	Reid	Australian Capital Territory	2	9 August 2021	26 August 2021	
Gold Creek School	Nicholls	Australian Capital Territory	2	10 August 2021	26 August 2021	

== See also ==
- COVID-19 (Coronavirus disease 2019)
- COVID-19 pandemic
- COVID-19 pandemic in Australia
- COVID-19 pandemic in Australia (timeline)
- COVID-19 vaccination in Australia
- Biosecurity in Australia
- National Cabinet of Australia
- National COVID-19 Coordination Commission
- National Security Committee (Australia)
- Coronavirus Australia
- Xenophobia and racism related to the COVID-19 pandemic#Australia
