= Aged care in Australia =

Services for the older adult

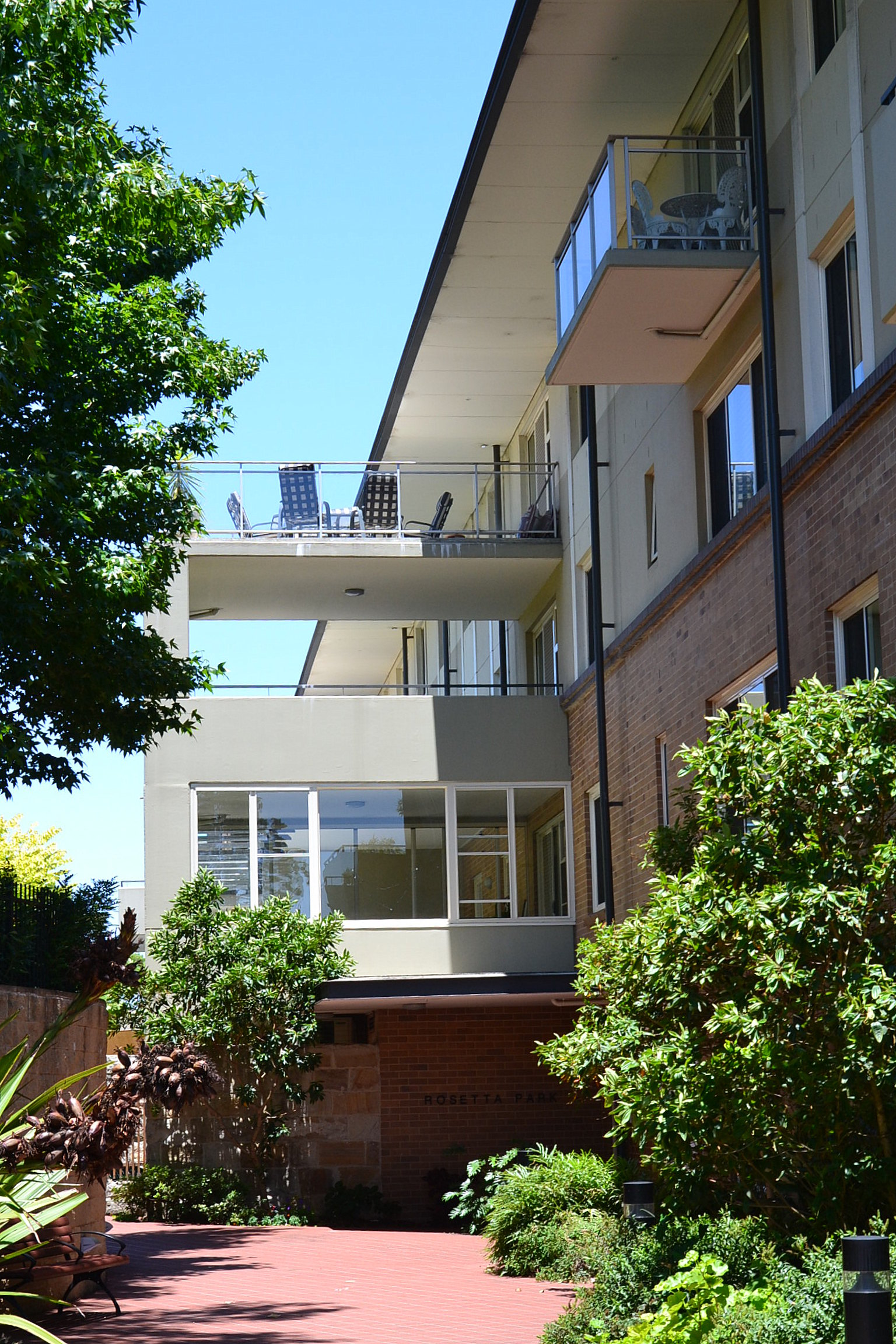
Aged Care Services, Wahroonga, Sydney

In Australia, aged care services are designed to meet the needs of the older adult and are typically provided by private enterprises. Services includes both residential aged care as well as home care services, such as personal care, home nursing, respite services, mobility and dexterity assistance, and the provision of equipment and aids. Many aged care services are subsidised by the Department of Health, Disability and Ageing through My Aged Care. Australians who are eligible for government subsidies are expected to contribute to the cost of services if they can afford to.

In 2018, the Royal Commission into Aged Care Quality and Safety was announced following media reporting exposing systemic failures and abuse in the nation's aged care sector. The royal commission made 148 recommendations in their 2021 final report, including the new Aged Care Act 2024 which came into effect on 1 November 2025, legislated minimum nursing and care requirements, and a new aged care regulator. The resulting overhaul of the system had bipartisan support and have been described as "once in a generation" and "the biggest reforms in aged care since John Howard's 1997 changes".

== Ageing population in Australia ==
Australia's population is getting older, due to longer life expectancy and low fertility rates. Results of the 2021 Australian census show that over 17% of Australians are aged over 65. By 2056, it is projected there will be 8.7 million older Australians (22% of the population); by 2096, 12.8 million people (25%) will be aged 65 years and over.

The impact of the ageing population is an increase in the number of Australians needing help in aged care. In 2016, almost a quarter of a million people (249,000) were using residential care, home care or transition care services—a 31% increase over the last decade.

The public aged-care system is already under strain, with fewer places than there is demand. By 2060, aged care demands are expected to put additional pressure on Australian governments equivalent to about six per cent of national GDP.

Since 2012, the government has been introducing reforms that move towards consumer-directed aged care - a more market-driven environment where the consumer (or their carer) can choose their service provider.

In response, more private business providers are entering the market, in competition with the government-funded and not-for-profit providers that have historically dominated. However, there is no official government channel that regulates private aged-care providers and reports on their quality of services such as staffing levels and skills and quality of care. The government announced a public inquiry into misconduct in the sector in September 2018. The Australian Broadcasting Corporation produced two-part documentary focusing on alleged neglect and abuse of older people. Service providers, including Estia Health, Regis Healthcare and Japara Healthcare lost about a sixth of their value. As of December 2022, a five-star rating system was in place across Australia rating aged care facilities - as of this time, 9% were rated as substandard.

== Aged care options ==
The three main options available to older people are:

- Stay in their own home and access in-home care and services to help them remain independent.
- Move into an aged care home (a residential aged care facility) where meals, accommodation, care services and nursing services (if required) are available.
- Move into a retirement village, where some services are available for a fee.

== In-home aged care ==
Most older Australians prefer to remain in their own home as they get older. 83% of people over 60 surveyed in the Housing Decisions of Older Australians research paper by the Australian Government's Productivity Commission in 2015, preferred to continue living in their own home (compared to 6% who preferred living in a retirement villages and 1% in a residential aged care facility.) If a person is generally able to manage but needs extra assistance with day to day tasks, they can access a number of services to support their independence while remaining in their own home.

Types of services that people can access in their home include:

- Personal care
- Domestic assistance
- Nutrition and meal preparation
- Continence management
- Mobility and dexterity assistance
- Nursing, allied health and other clinical services
- Transport and assistance getting around in their community
- Equipment and aids.
- Social Support
- Flexible Respite
- Allied Health Services / Physiotherapy / Occupational Therapy / Dietetics / Podiatry

=== Funding ===
As of 2018 there are two types of funding provided by the Australian government available to help subsidise the costs of in-home aged care services for eligible people.

==== Home Care Package ====
A Home Care Package provides long-term help to allow people to stay independent in their own home as long as possible and offer four levels of care packages to support people with basic, low, intermediate, and high care needs.

Depending on the level of support needed, an aged care services provider can work with an individual to create a care plan tailored to their needs. A Home Care Package can deliver a mix of services including:

- Personal care
- Domestic assistance
- Nutrition and meal preparation
- Continence management
- Mobility and dexterity assistance
- Nursing, allied health and other clinical services
- Transport and assistance getting around in their community
- Provision of equipment and aids
- Assistive technology

It is possible to change services or move to a different level of package based on changing needs.

Older Australians or their carer can contact the My Aged Care service provided by the Australian Government to find out if they can access government funding to help cover the cost of Aged Care Services. My Aged Care can arrange for the person to be assessed by the Aged Care Assessment Team (ACAT) or ACAS (Victoria only).

The funding a person receive varies depending on the level of their Home Care Package and is paid direct to the service provider. If personal circumstances allow, the Government expects people receiving funding to contribute to the cost of their care.

The amount they will need to contribute is based on their income and is determined by the Department of Health, Disability and Ageing.

===== Commonwealth Home Support Programme =====
If a person only requires short-term help or some assistance with daily activities around the home, the Commonwealth Home Support Programme allows them to access the specific services they need, when they need them. The Commonwealth Home Support Programme lets the older person choose the services they need as required. Services available under the Commonwealth Home Support Programme include:

- Personal care
- Domestic assistance
- Meal preparation
- Social support
- Flexible respite
- Allied Health / Physiotherapy

The person can choose from a set menu of services based on when they need them and can enter and leave the programme as their needs change.

To access services provided by the Commonwealth Home Support Programme, the person will need to be assessed by a team member from the Regional Assessment Service either in their home or on the phone.

The subsidy programme does not necessarily fund the full cost of the service, so each person may pay a small contribution. Special consideration is available to people experiencing financial difficulty.

=== Costs ===
The Australian government pays for the bulk of aged care in Australia. However, to receive help at home through the government's home care packages, one needs to contribute towards one or both of the following:

- A basic daily fee, which is a percentage of one's aged pension
- A means-tested fee, payable if one's income is over a certain amount

Once an individual has had an ACAT assessment, this will be sent to Centrelink, which will determine how much needs to be paid.

An ACAT assessment is a comprehensive assessment with an Aged Care Assessment Team. ACATs are teams of medical, nursing and allied health professionals who assess the physical, psychological, medical, restorative, cultural and social needs of frail older people and help them and their carers to access appropriate levels of support.

The cost will vary depending on whether the funding is provided under the Commonwealth Home Support Programme or the Home Care Packages Program. If a person is not eligible for a subsidy from the Australian Government, they can still access aged care services privately but will be required to cover the associated costs.

== 2017 changes to in-home care ==
In February 2017, the Australian Government introduced Increasing Choice in Home Care reforms. These reforms are designed to give older people more choice and control over their home care. Recipients of government funding to cover the cost of aged care services are now able to choose their preferred provider of in home aged care services. They can also choose to change their provider at any time.

Once a person's application for funding is successful, they will be allocated their funding based on how long they have been waiting and also on their individual care needs and personal circumstances.

A person can accrue unspent funds that are left over from their package after any expenses and fees have been deducted. If they change home care provider these unspent funds will be transferred to the new provider.

After 27 February 2017, aged care providers are able to charge customers an exit fee to cover administrative costs which will be deducted from any unspent funds. Providers are legally required to publish their maximum exit fees on the My Aged Care website. Not all providers require exit fees.

== Aged care homes ==
As people grow older, they may need more help with day-to-day tasks or health care. In some cases the best way to receive help and support can be by living in an aged care home (also known as nursing homes) either on a permanent basis or for a short stay (called "residential respite").

Aged care homes offer accommodation services (also known as “hotel services”) and personal care assistance (e.g. bathing & personal hygiene, continence management, dressing). Aged care homes may also provide complex care and services such as specialized bedding materials, non-customized mobility goods, incontinence aids, nursing services and allied health services.

Most aged care homes in Australia receive funding from the Australian Government. The aged care system in Australia aims to make sure that all older people can receive support and quality care when they need it.

If a person's care needs are less than those supplied by an aged care home, independent living units or retirement villages are an alternative. These residential communities offer a variety of services for older people to help them live independently, and are regulated by state and territory governments.

A younger person with disabilities can also live in residential aged care settings. As of 2015, over 7,000 young disabled people lived in aged care homes. A goal of the National Disability Insurance Scheme is to get younger people with disabilities out of residential age care settings.

=== Funding for residential aged care ===
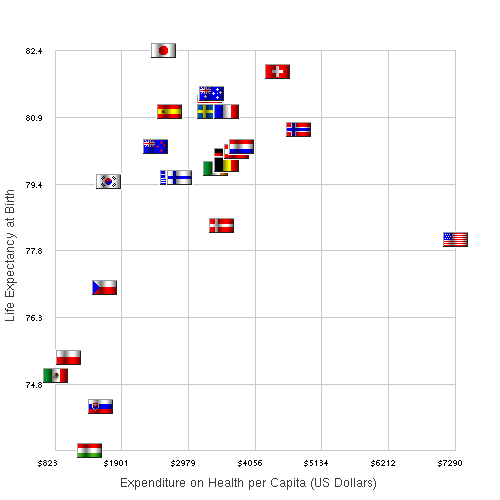
Healthcare spending vs life expectancy for some countries in 2007

The Australian Government funds the majority of aged care in Australia but people are expected to contribute to the cost of their care if they can afford to.

There are also specific programmes and information available to Aboriginal and Torres Strait Islander people; people from culturally or linguistically diverse backgrounds; people who are lesbian, gay, bisexual, transgender or intersex; or Care-Leavers.

Older veterans, those who are financially disadvantaged, people living with disability and those living away from large towns can also access tailored support.

To determine eligibility to receive funding, a member of an Aged Care Assessment Team (ACAT, or ACAS in Victoria) will carry out an assessment with the person to identify their needs and circumstances and work out what options are available to them.

== Aged care assessment ==
Whether an older person requires help with basic tasks at home or more intensive aged care services, they will need to arrange an assessment with the My Aged Care service.

My Aged Care will register the person's details and ask them a series of questions to help identify their needs and circumstances such as:

- any support they are currently receiving
- if they have any health concerns
- how they are managing with activities around the home
- some questions relating to their safety in the home

From there they may be referred for a home support assessment, a comprehensive assessment, or direct referral to services.

=== Home support assessment ===
If a person has entry level aged care needs, My Aged Care may arrange a home support assessment to identify their care needs. The assessment will be undertaken by a local assessor from the My Aged Care Regional Assessment Service.

=== Comprehensive assessment ===
If the older person has more complex aged care needs, a comprehensive assessment by a member of an Aged Care Assessment Team (ACAT, or ACAS in Victoria) may be organized for them if they want to access government funded services or if they are considering moving into an aged care home. A person may also need to have a comprehensive assessment if they are ready to leave hospital, or if they need a short break in an aged care home (also called 'respite care').

== Government policies and reviews ==
In 2011 the Productivity Commission produced a report called "Caring for older Australians". The report included recommended reforms, known as the "Living Longer Living Better" (LLLB) reforms. Further changes in aged care policy followed, before former senior public servant David Tune was appointed by the Minister for Aged Care as an independent reviewer under the Aged Care (Living Longer Living Better) Act 2013, to review changes to the systems in place since the reforms. Tune wrote the "Legislated review of aged care" report for the Department of Health, published in September 2017. This report said "There is a broad consensus shared by government and sector stakeholders that aged care requires further reform to become a more consumer-centred system. This includes orienting care and the supply of different care types around the demands of consumers, and giving consumers greater choice and control. This objective is evident in the work of advisory bodies in the sector: the Aged Care Financing Authority, the Aged Care Sector Committee, and the National Aged Care Alliance". The report addressed funding issues which were arising as the "Baby Boomer" generation reaches the age of 80 The government would no longer be able to sustain its (2017) level of funding, which was around three-quarters of all aged care costs, and "there is a strong case to increase the proportion of the costs that are met by consumers". The report included 38 recommendations.

The Royal Commission into Aged Care Quality and Safety was appointed in 2018. The final report was tabled on 1 March 2021.

In July 2023, another report by David Tune, the "Report of the Independent Capability Review of the Aged Care Quality and Safety Commission" was published. The report was commissioned in response to recommendations 10 and 104 of the Royal Commission into Aged Care Quality and Safety.

The Aged Care Bill 2024 was introduced in the Australian Parliament in September 2024, and passed both houses on 25 November 2024. The new Aged Care Act 2024 comes into effect on 1 July 2025.

== See also ==
- Dementia and Alzheimer's disease in Australia
