= Heritage Care =

Australian company, owner of aged care homes

Heritage Care Pty Ltd is a for-profit nursing home management company, based in Australia. Its chief executive is John Rutledge.

It has a portfolio of 10 nursing homes in New South Wales and Victoria.

As of August 2020, the company is divided in ownership between Peter Arvanitis, his wife Areti Arvanitis, who jointly own one-half; while the other belongs to Tony Antonopoulos.

== Mismanagement allegations ==
=== Epping Gardens facility ===
==== Abusive and inept Staff ====
Staff of Heritage Care at the Epping Gardens Aged Care home have been publicly accused of abusing residents. It was reported in The Age that a family member had claimed a staff member had yelled at her 95 year old mother so badly, that she had retreated to her room and 'vomited violently'. The Age also reported that a deceased resident had been left to lie on the floor for 26 hours, while mishandling phone calls from a funeral director arranged by the resident's son; while the son was only offered a 'half-hearted' apology by staff. The son also described a situation where his family members would often find their mother in a state of unwash and undress, when visiting. Other relatives of facility residents described being force to personally bathe and change their family members, due to the facility being so short of staff.

==== Mismanagement during the COVID-19 pandemic ====
During the outbreak of COVID-19 in Victoria, a facility managed by Heritage Care Pty Ltd; the Epping Gardens Aged Care home, experienced a sudden surge in cases. Families of the residents of the home publicly accused the company of serious mismanagement in attempting to stop the virus outbreak. While the Epping Gardens facility had passed accreditation audits in the years before the outbreak, the regulator found that the facility was operating in breach of requirements relating to risks, clinical care and infection.

It was reported by Guardian Australia, that the federal department of health had ordered control of the company's Epping Gardens facility be handed to Austin Health. This followed Austin Health threatening to walk out if Heritage Care continued to take control of clinical care, after Heritage refused assistance from Austin when sent in to assist during the crisis. Federal and State health workers subsequently took control of Epping Gardens facility.

=== Heritage Botany facility ===
In August 2020, it was reported by Sydney Morning Herald's Michael Bachelard; that the company also runs a home in Sydney, Heritage Botany, that scored zero out of eight in a September 2019 quality assessment audit by the Commonwealth Aged Care Safety and Quality Commission. The 'scathing' audit had found that nutrition, hydration, injuries, falls, and pains were inadequate; food was poor and culturally inappropriate, and residents who were unable to feed themselves were neglected. The audit had found that staff had been cut, leaving residents uncared for. Heritage Care was allowed by the regulator to continue operating the facility, yet by January 2020 the company had still failed to comply with one of the eight standards within the audit. Heritage did not respond to the Guardian's reporting about the company's failed audit.

Heritage care has been accused by the Health Services Union of outsourcing its cleaning and catering services while cutting hours at facilities. According to the union, hours at the Heritage Botany kitchen in NSW were cut by 20 percent in 2020. The national president of the union Gerard Hayes said of the cuts;

'there was no engagement in that process at all for the workers, some of whom had worked for the organisation and its predecessors for 20 years. When our members are earning $22 an hour its pretty galling to see the owners driving around in Masteratis'

The company's chief executive responded to the Sydney Morning Herald's reporting in part by saying that cuts at the facility had taken place "because the number of residents, who had been living up to four in a room, was reduced from 170 to 100, making the space more livable but reducing demand on the kitchen".

== See also ==
- Aged Care Act 1997
- BUPA
- Department of Health and Human Services (Victoria)
- Department of Health
- Richard Colbeck
