= Aged Care Act 1997 =

Former Australian legislation

Parliament of Australia
- Long title: An Act relating to aged care, and for other purposes
- Citation: No. 112 of 1997 or No. 112 of 1997 as amended
- Territorial extent: States and territories of Australia
- Enacted by: House of Representatives
- Royal assent: 7 July 1997
- Commenced: 7 July 1997
- Repealed: 1 July 2025
- Introduced by: Howard government

Repealed by
- Aged Care Act 2024

Summary
- Act legislating the Australian aged care system and the Commonwealth Government's involvement in aged care safety, quality and funding.
- Status: Repealed

The Aged Care Act 1997 (Cth) is an Act of the Australian parliament regulating aged care, particularly services funded by the Commonwealth government.

The Act was replaced by the Aged Care Act 2024 via the Aged Care (Consequential and Transitional Provisions) Act 2024 following the Royal Commission into Aged Care Quality and Safety, which found systemic failures in the aged care system. The new Aged Care Act came into effect on 1 July 2025.

== The Act ==
It sets out rules on funding, regulation, approval of providers, subsidies and fees, standards, quality of care, rights of people receiving care and non-compliance.

It is the basis of the proposed Aged Care Code of Conduct which is to come into effect on 1 December 2022. This requires approved providers, aged care workers (including contractors) and governing persons to meet a series of obligations.

When providing care, supports and services to people, I must:

- act with respect for people's rights to freedom of expression, self-determination and decision-making in accordance with applicable laws and conventions;
- act in a way that treats people with dignity and respect, and values their diversity;
- act with respect for the privacy of people;
- provide care, supports and services in a safe and competent manner, with care and skill;
- act with integrity, honesty and transparency;
- promptly take steps to raise and act on concerns about matters that may impact the quality and safety of care, supports and services;
- provide care, supports and services free from: i. all forms of violence, discrimination, exploitation, neglect and abuse; and ii. sexual misconduct; and
- take all reasonable steps to prevent and respond to: i. all forms of violence, discrimination, exploitation, neglect and abuse; and ii. sexual misconduct.

Non-compliance can lead to fines of up to $55,500 for individuals and $277,500.00 for bodies corporate.

== Legacy ==
It has been described as a turning point for aged care policy in Australia. It led to an increase in private investment. Private equity firms, new foreign investors, and superannuation and property real estate investment trusts all entered the Australian residential aged care market. The staffing requirements contained in the Act have been condemned as disgracefully inadequate, and there is said to be “a complete absence of any positive and mandatory legal obligation on the part of facilities to take proactive measures to promote mental health and wellbeing of their residents”.

On 2 March 2018 the Federal Court of Australia decided that Regis Healthcare's Asset Replacement Charge was not consistent with the Act. These charges were intended to “fund reinstatements of fixtures, fittings and infrastructure, rebuilding and construction of, or at, Regis's residential care facilities.”

== See also ==
- Queensland Community Care Network
