= Joseph McGrath =

Joseph McGrath may refer to:

- Joe McGrath (Australian footballer) (1911–1968), Australian rules footballer
- Joe McGrath (Gaelic games) (?–2013), Irish Gaelic football and hurling coach
- Joe McGrath (Canadian football) (born 1980), professional Canadian football player
- Joe McGrath (Irish footballer), former New Zealand national football coach
- Joseph McGrath (Irish politician) (1888–1966), Irish politician
- Joseph McGrath (American politician) (1890–1943), American politician
- Joseph McGrath (Australian politician) (1886–1937), Tasmanian politician
- Joseph McGrath (film director) (born 1930), Scottish film director
- Joseph E. McGrath (1927–2007), American social psychologist
- Joseph Francis McGrath (1871–1950), Irish-born American prelate of the Roman Catholic Church
