= Joe McGrath (Australian footballer) =

Australian rules footballer (1911–1968)

Personal information
- Full name: Joseph Augustine McGrath
- Born: 22 September 1911; Yarraville, Victoria
- Died: 10 June 1968 (aged 56); Footscray Hospital, Footscray, Victoria
- Original team: Yarraville
- Height: 170 cm (5 ft 7 in)
- Weight: 71 kg (157 lb)

Playing career^{1}
Years	Club	Games (Goals)
1932–37, 39–40	Yarraville (VFA)	105 (175)
1938	Footscray	2 (1)
- ^{1} Playing statistics correct to the end of 1940.

Joseph Augustine McGrath (22 September 1911 – 10 June 1968) was an Australian rules footballer who played with Footscray in the Victorian Football League (VFL).

== Family ==
The son of James McGrath, and Mary Ellen McGrath (1872–1930), née Ahern, Joseph Augustine McGrath was born at Yarraville, Victoria on 22 September 1911.

He married Elizabeth Ann "Betty" Heriot (1913–1999), later Mrs. James Bird, on 5 November 1938.

== Death ==
He died at the Footscray Hospital on 10 June 1968.
