= Lynelle Briggs =

Australian public servant

Lynelle Briggs AO

Australian Public Service Commissioner
- In office November 2004 – 2009

Personal details
- Born: Lynelle Jann Briggs; 23 June 1957 (age 69) Mudgee, New South Wales, Australia
- Education: University of Sydney
- Occupation: Public servant

Lynelle Jann Briggs, AO (born 23 June 1957) is a former Australian Public Service Commissioner. She was chief executive of Medicare from 2009 until 2011, when Medicare was integrated into the Department of Human Services.

== Life and career ==
In the 1980s, Briggs spent two years working for the New Zealand Treasury.

Between 2001 and 2004, Briggs was a Deputy Secretary in the Department of Transport and Regional Services. In November 2004, she was appointed the Australian Public Service Commissioner. Then, from August 2009 to June 2011, Briggs was the Chief Executive to Medicare Australia. During her time as head of Medicare, Briggs worked alongside Finn Pratt and Carolyn Hogg to integrate Medicare Australia, the Department of Human Services, Centrelink and CRS Australia into one department for better service design and delivery outcomes for Australians.

In 2012, she was appointed to lead an inquiry into building site safety in Canberra, her report of the inquiry recommended many changes to ACT construction training, enforcement and culture.

Briggs is currently a board member of the Australian Rail Track Corporation.

In October 2018, Briggs was appointed a Royal Commissioner on the Royal Commission into Aged Care Quality and Safety.

== Awards ==
Briggs was made an Officer of the Order of Australia in January 2013 for distinguished service to public administration, particularly through leadership in the development of public service performance and professionalism.

Government offices
Preceded by Andrew Podger	Australian Public Service Commissioner; 2004–2009	Succeeded by Steve Sedgwick
