= Aged Care Act 2024 =

Australian aged care legislation

Parliament of Australia
- Long title: An Act about aged care, and for related purposes
- Citation: Aged Care Act 2024 (Cth)
- Territorial extent: Australia
- Considered by: Australian House of Representatives
- Enacted: 25 November 2024
- Considered by: Australian Senate
- Assented to: 2 December 2024
- Effective: 1 November 2025

Legislative history

First chamber: Australian House of Representatives
- Bill title: Aged Care Bill 2024
- Introduced by: Anika Wells, Minister for Aged Care
- Introduced: 12 September 2024
- First reading: 12 September 2024
- Second reading: 8 October – 7 November 2024
- Committee of the whole: 21 November 2024
- Third reading: 25 November 2024

Second chamber: Australian Senate
- Member(s) in charge: Malarndirri McCarthy
- First reading: 18 November 2024
- Second reading: 18 November 2024
- Third reading: 21 November 2024
- Passed: 25 November 2024

Repeals
- Aged Care Act 1997; Aged Care (Transitional Provisions) Act 1997; Aged Care Quality and Safety Commission Act 2018

Summary
- Aged care services
- Status: In force

The Aged Care Act 2024 is the Australian federal legislation regulating aged care services in Australia, focusing on the rights of the older adult. The Act supersedes the previous Aged Care Act 1997 following multiple years of reform speared by the 2018–21 Royal Commission into Aged Care Quality and Safety. The Act is part of the Health and Aged Care legislation portfolio and is administered by the Department of Health, Disability and Ageing.

The Aged Care Bill 2024 was introduced by the Labor Albanese government on 12 September 2024, having gained prior bipartisan support from the opposition Coalition. The Act came into effect on 1 November 2025 at the same time as the new Support at Home program, delayed from its original commencement date of 1 July.

== Legislation ==
The Aged Care Act 2024 is described by the Department of Health, Disability and Ageing as putting "the rights of older people at the centre of the aged care system." The Act draws on a different section of constitutional powers to focus on resident-centred care and upholding the human rights of the older adult whilst receiving aged care. Changes implemented by the Act include:

- legislating a Statement of Rights and Statement of Principles for aged care residents, and Code of Conduct and Quality Standards for registered providers
- formalising a single entry and assessment process to access aged care services
- implementing new funding and subsidy models for Commonwealth-funded services, and increasing transparency of costs
- supplying additional funding to the aged care sector to improve the working conditions and pay of care staff
- create a new regulatory model with:
  - increased powers of the Aged Care Quality and Safety Commission
  - a new provider registration system.

The creation of the new act was speared by the Royal Commission into Aged Care Quality and Safety, of which the leading recommendation is a new aged care act. The Act gives authority to the Aged Care Rules 2025, which allow the Department to provide instruction on how the Aged Care Act is to be implemented by the sector.

=== Priority reforms ===
Following the royal commission, some priority reforms were made to the former Aged Care Act 1997 to deliver immediate changes impacting aged care safety and sustainability. These included a new funding mechanism (the Australian National Aged Care Classification), the Serious Incident Response Scheme, the Star Rating quality reporting system, and 24/7 registered nurse requirements.

=== Superseded legislation ===
The Aged Care Act 2024 replaces the former Aged Care Act 1997 which was introduced by the Howard government, the Aged Care (Transitional Provisions) Act 1997 and the Aged Care Quality and Safety Commission Act 2018. The Aged Care (Consequential Amendments and Transitional Provisions) Act 2024 and Transitional Rules section of the Aged Care Rules 2025 actions the repeal of previous legislation and transition of existing systems to the new Act.

== Criticism ==
There have been concerns that older people in aged care services may not be able to access the same amount of services as prior to the reforms.
