= Dementia and Alzheimer's disease in Australia =

Major health issue in Australia

In 2012, Australia was among the most heavily affected by deaths per million persons due to dementia. 0–4 5–8 9–10 11–13 14–17 18–24 25–45 46–114 115–375 376–1266

Dementia and Alzheimer's disease in Australia is a major health issue. Alzheimer's disease is the most common type of dementia in Australia. Dementia is an ever-increasing challenge as the population ages and life expectancy increases. As a consequence, there is an expected increase in the number of people with dementia, posing countless challenges to carers and the health and aged care systems. In 2018, an estimated 376,000 people had dementia; this number is expected to increase to 550,000 by 2030 and nearly triple to 900,000 by 2050. The dementia death rate is increasing, resulting in the shift from fourth to second leading cause of death from 2006 to 2015. It is expected to become the leading cause of death over the next number of years. In 2011, it was the fourth leading cause of disease burden and third leading cause of disability burden. This is expected to remain the same until at least 2020.

Dementia primarily affects older people, approximately 95% of all dementia deaths occur after the age of 74. People aged 75 and over accounted for the majority (72%) of the burden due to dementia. It was the leading cause of death for women and third leading cause of death for men. There is a sex bias, as women have higher mortality rates, morbidity and burden of dementia than men. In 2018, 61% of people with dementia were women. The rate of dementia differs between population subgroups. Aboriginal and Torres Strait Islander people experience risk factors and prevalence at a higher and earlier rate than non-indigenous Australians.

Dementia is the ninth National Health Priority Area. For this reason, health and service policy and expenditure is especially focused on this significant burden of disease. Since dementia is typically not reversible, its extended illness and disability poses a significant financial burden to Australia. In 2016, total costs continued to increase to an estimated A$14.25 billion. Future costs are projected to reach $33.6 billion in 2050 (estimated from 2013–2014 total costs).

== Epidemiology ==
A study of the epidemiology of a disease, such as dementia, identifies the predominant patterns (mortality and burden of disease), distribution (morbidity), determinants and specified populations or characteristics in a population. Studies of the epidemiology of the Australian population identified dementia as a major health problem, due to the high mortality, morbidity and burden of disease.

=== Mortality ===
Number of deaths with an underlying cause of dementia, by sex, 2001 to 2010
Year	Male	Female	Persons
2001	1,177	2,563	3,740
2002	1,390	2,974	4,364
2003	1,351	2,924	4,275
2004	1,414	3,192	4,606
2005	1,434	3,219	4,653
2006	2,076	4,474	6,550
2007	2,414	4,904	7,318
2008	2,708	5,464	8,172
2009	2,787	5,492	8,279
2010	2,920	6,083	9,003

In 2017, dementia and Alzheimer's disease remained the second leading cause of mortality or death and ischaemic heart diseases remained the leading cause of death. In 2017, dementia and Alzheimer's disease was responsible for 13,729 deaths. Over the past decade the death rate has increased by 68.0%, from 33.1 deaths per 100,000 people in 2008 to 41.6 deaths per 100,000 people in 2017. Dementia deaths have increased, remaining in the top five leading causes of death for both sexes. In 2017, it was the leading cause of death for women and third leading cause of death for men. 64.5% of dementia deaths are attributed to women.

=== Morbidity ===
In 2018, the morbidity or prevalence was estimated as 376,000 people. In 2018, approximately 8.7% of the population aged 65 and over had dementia. The prevalence is estimated to increase to 550,000 by 2030 and triple to around 900,000 by 2050. The national prevalence is similar to the OECD member country average. Women have a higher prevalence than men. In 2018, 61% of people with dementia were women. Estimations propose that in 2050, women will continue to account for roughly 60% of people with dementia.

Incidence is the number of new cases of a particular disease which occur in a specified period. There are major gaps in the incidence data for dementia. In 2003, there was an estimated 37,100 incident cases. In 2011, the number of incident cases increased to 63,300. Since dementia is typically not reversible, in time, these incident cases are included in the prevalence data.

=== Burden of disease ===
Burden of disease is the measure of premature death and non-fatal health outcomes of a particular disease. In 2011, it was the fourth leading cause of burden of disease. People aged 75 and over, accounted for the majority (72%) of the burden due to dementia. More of the burden due to dementia is attributed to women than men. In 2011, among people aged 65 and over, it was the leading cause of non-fatal burden of disease such as disability and the second leading cause of total burden of disease.

=== Determinants ===
There are numerous risk factors that have been identified as likely determinants. Age, genetics and family history are unmodifiable risk factors. Australia has an ageing population with increasing life expectancy. The majority of modifiable risk factors are related to vascular diseases and contribute to the burden of dementia and Alzheimer's disease. These risk factors include vascular diseases (stroke, diabetes, chronic kidney disease and atrial fibrillation), metabolic risk factors (high blood pressure and obesity) and behavioural risk factors (physical inactivity and tobacco use). Vascular risk factors were accountable for approximately 5.2–8.4% of the dementia and Alzheimer's disease burden. In 2011, chronic kidney disease, physical inactivity, stroke and high blood pressure were the specific vascular risk factors most responsible for the dementia burden.

=== Sociodemographic characteristics ===
==== Age ====
Dementia and Alzheimer's disease is more prevalent among older people. Late onset dementia (diagnosed from 65 years and over) is far more prevalent than early-onset Alzheimer's disease (diagnosed before 65 years). People aged 75 and over accounted for the majority (72%) of the burden due to dementia. Between 2014 and 2016 it was the second leading cause of death and second leading cause of disease burden for older people (aged 75 and over). In 2015, the median age of death from dementia was 88.6 years, compared to 81.9 years for all deaths. Approximately 20% of all dementia deaths occurred in people aged 75–84 and 70% in those 85 years of age and over. Dementia mostly affects the elderly with approximately 95% of all dementia deaths occurring after the age of 74.

==== Sex ====
Women have higher mortality rates, morbidity and burden of dementia than men. In 2018, 61% of people with dementia were women. Dementia was the leading cause of death for women. In 2015, women died from dementia at a rate 1.2 times greater than that of men. In 2017, it was the cause of death of 8,859 women, compared to the cause of death of 4,870 men. Women have a longer life expectancy (84.5 years compared to 80.4 years for men) and given the increased risk of dementia at older ages, is a contributing factor to the sex bias. In 2011, more of the burden due to dementia was attributed to women than men (63% compared with 37%).

==== Aboriginal and Torres Strait Islander people ====
The rate of disease differs between population subgroups such as Aboriginal and Torres Strait Islander people. Aboriginal and Torres Strait Islander people encounter risk factors for dementia and Alzheimer's disease at a higher rate than non-indigenous Australians. These risk factors include tobacco use, diabetes and heart disease. The prevalence for Aboriginal and Torres Strait Islander people is projected to be at a 2–5 times higher rate than the general Australian population. Aboriginal and Torres Strait Islander people are also identified to be affected at an earlier age (from 45 to 69 years) then the general Australian population.

== Current and future costs ==
Dementia and Alzheimer's disease poses a significant financial burden to Australia. In 2011, the cost to Australia was an estimated $11.8 billion. The total costs increased in 2016, to an estimated $14.25 billion. Future costs are projected to increase to an estimated $33.6 billion in 2050 (estimated from 2013–2014 total costs). Healthcare and related costs are rapidly rising with residential aged care and hospitalisation costs as the primary direct costs. The types of costs associated with residential aged care and hospitalisation costs are the care recipient's expenditure, federal government expenditure and residential aged care capital and maintenance costs. The care recipient's expenditure or patient expenditure can include housing payments, basic daily fees and additional service fees. Other associated costs include anti-dementia medications, transport, palliative care, alternative medications and therapies.

Dementia and Alzheimer's disease poses a significant social burden and cost to the Australian population, particularly to the people with dementia, their carers, family and friends. Australian family carers of people living with dementia often experience social exclusion and a reduced or removed capacity to work. People with dementia living in Australian residential care, often have significantly worse activities of daily living (Modified Barthel index) and fewer weekly social interactions than people without dementia.

== Programs, bodies and initiatives ==
=== Policy and service responses ===
The Minister's Dementia Advisory Group and Dementia Working Group are the two key national bodies involved in consultation and planning for dementia policy and services. In 2005, the Australian Federal Government funded the four year Dementia Initiative or Dementia—A National Health Priority Initiative. In 2006, the National Framework for Action on Dementia 2006–2010 (NFAD) was implemented. In 2011, a ruling was made to continue using the existing NFAD, until the development of a second Framework. The 2011–2012 Federal Budget introduced the inception of Flexible Funds, including Aged Care Service Improvement and Healthy Ageing Grants Fund. Dementia was a priority area of this fund. Flexible Funds came into effect in July 2011, altering the system for funding health and aged care programs. In August 2011, the Australian Government issued 'Living Longer. Living Better'. This aged care reform package included $268.4 million over five years for dementia-related programs and services. In August 2012, dementia was recognised as the ninth National Health Priority Area. In 2015, the NFAD was replaced by a second framework: National Framework for Action on Dementia 2015–2019 (the Framework). The Framework works in consideration with the National Disability Insurance Scheme (NDIS). People with a diagnosis of dementia may be eligible for certain services through the NDIS. Between 2014 and 2016 the Federal Government redesigned dementia care in aged care and dementia programs and services. Changes included the establishment of the Specialist Dementia Care Program and a single national provider for Dementia Behaviour Management Advisory Services (DBMAS) and the Dementia Training Program.

=== Government expenditure ===
In 2003, the total health and aged care system expenditure for dementia was an estimated $1.4 billion. In 2009–2010, the total direct governmental health and aged care system expenditure on people with dementia was more than $4.9 billion, with an estimated $2.0 billion of the expenditure credited to dementia. In 2016, the direct expenditure was an estimated $8.8 billion. The Australian Federal Government committed a new investment of $185 million in the 2019–2020 Health Budget. This investment is for the long-term Ageing, and Aged Care and Dementia Mission.

=== Health and aged care services ===
The following health and aged care services are the formal services provided to and utilised by people with dementia and their carers: consumer support programs, general practice services, hospital services, aged care assessments, community aged care packages, community aged care services, flexible aged care services, respite care, residential aged care services, specialised mental health care services and medications (Pharmaceutical Benefits Scheme and Repatriation Pharmaceutical Benefits Scheme).

=== Dementia Australia National ===
Dementia Australia is a national initiative for dementia and Alzheimer's disease. Dementia Australia is the new coordinator of Alzheimer's Australia Association. Dementia Australia is a national peak body, national advocacy organisation and registered non-profit charity that provides national dementia programs and services. Each state and territory also has specific services and programs for their region. Certain Dementia Australia programs and services are funded by the Australian Commonwealth Government such as the early intervention program: Living with Memory Loss Programme. Living with Memory Loss Programme is a seven-week course for primary carers and persons with dementia. Dementia Australia is also involved in research. The Dementia Australia Research Foundation formerly Alzheimer's Australia Research Ltd delivers grants and scholarships for dementia and Alzheimer's research.

=== My Aged Care ===
My Aged Care is a phone line and a website that provides information on Australia's aged care system and services such as dementia care options and support services. My Aged Care is a free health service under Healthdirect Australia for consumers, service providers and health professionals. My Aged Care is the start point to access Australian Government funded services. In order to access funded services, My Aged Care organises assessments wherein a trained assessor works out care needs, service eligibility and respite care for people with dementia and their carers.

=== National Disability Insurance Scheme ===
The National Disability Insurance Scheme (NDIS) is a national program that provides supports, through an NDIS plan, to people under the age of 65 with a permanent disability, such as early-onset dementia. If eligible for an NDIS plan, funding is provided on an annual basis for the purchase of aids, equipment and services. The NDIS and the Department of Social Services funds the National Younger Onset Dementia Key Worker Program for people with early-onset dementia. This program is a dementia consumer support service that is an extension of the National Dementia Support Program. The National Younger Onset Dementia Key Worker Program provides information, support, counselling, advice and assistance with engagement and access of appropriate services, particularly NDIS supports and plans.

== See also ==
- Health in Australia
- Health care in Australia
- Indigenous health in Australia
