= Thebarton Senior College =

School in Torrensville, Adelaide, Australia

Location
- Torrensville, Adelaide, South Australia; Australia
- Coordinates: 34°55′02″S 138°33′46″E

Information
- Type: Public, senior secondary school.
- Motto: Carpe Diem
- Established: 1924
- Principal: Eva Kannis-Torry
- Grades: 11–12, vocational to Certificate 4
- Enrollment: 1100 FTE
- Colours: Maroon, gold
- Website: http://www.tsc.sa.edu.au/

Thebarton Senior College is a public senior secondary school located in Torrensville in Adelaide, South Australia. The school was established on the site in 1924 as Thebarton Boys Technical High School, with adult re-entry students accepted in 1988 and then formally becoming an adult re-entry college in 1990. From 2012, it is providing senior students with the opportunity of completing their South Australian Certificate of Education, either alone or in conjunction with a nationally accredited vocational certificate.

The College grounds and facilities were upgraded in 2005. It has a gymnasium, cafeteria, library, study centre and up-to-date technology for use by staff and students. In 2010 a new Language Centre and Technology facilities were completed. During 2013, new library extensions are being built which will provide state-of-the-art study facilities.

== Students ==
The students are senior secondary (mainly aged 16 or over) who wish to complete their secondary education, undertake vocational programs or learn English in the New Arrivals Program. Many are part-time and there are over 1000 full-time equivalent students. The College draws its students from all parts of the greater metropolitan area but particularly from the central and north western side.

In 2009 the College won the SA Training Award for Best Small Training Provider (fewer than 1500 students) and in 2008 was winner of the VET in Schools Excellence award. The College is a Registered Training Provider for a range of vocational certificates which are recognised nationally and is a Skills for All training provider.

== New Arrivals Program ==
The College is the only adult New Arrivals Program provider in South Australia. The New Arrivals Program is an intensive English language acquisition course for newly arrived adult migrant and refugee students. While the focus of the program is to provide non-English-speaking students with the level of language proficiency needed to undertake future SACE studies, mathematics, science and computing are integral to the curriculum and also have a language emphasis.
