= Box Hill Hospital =

- Eastern Health
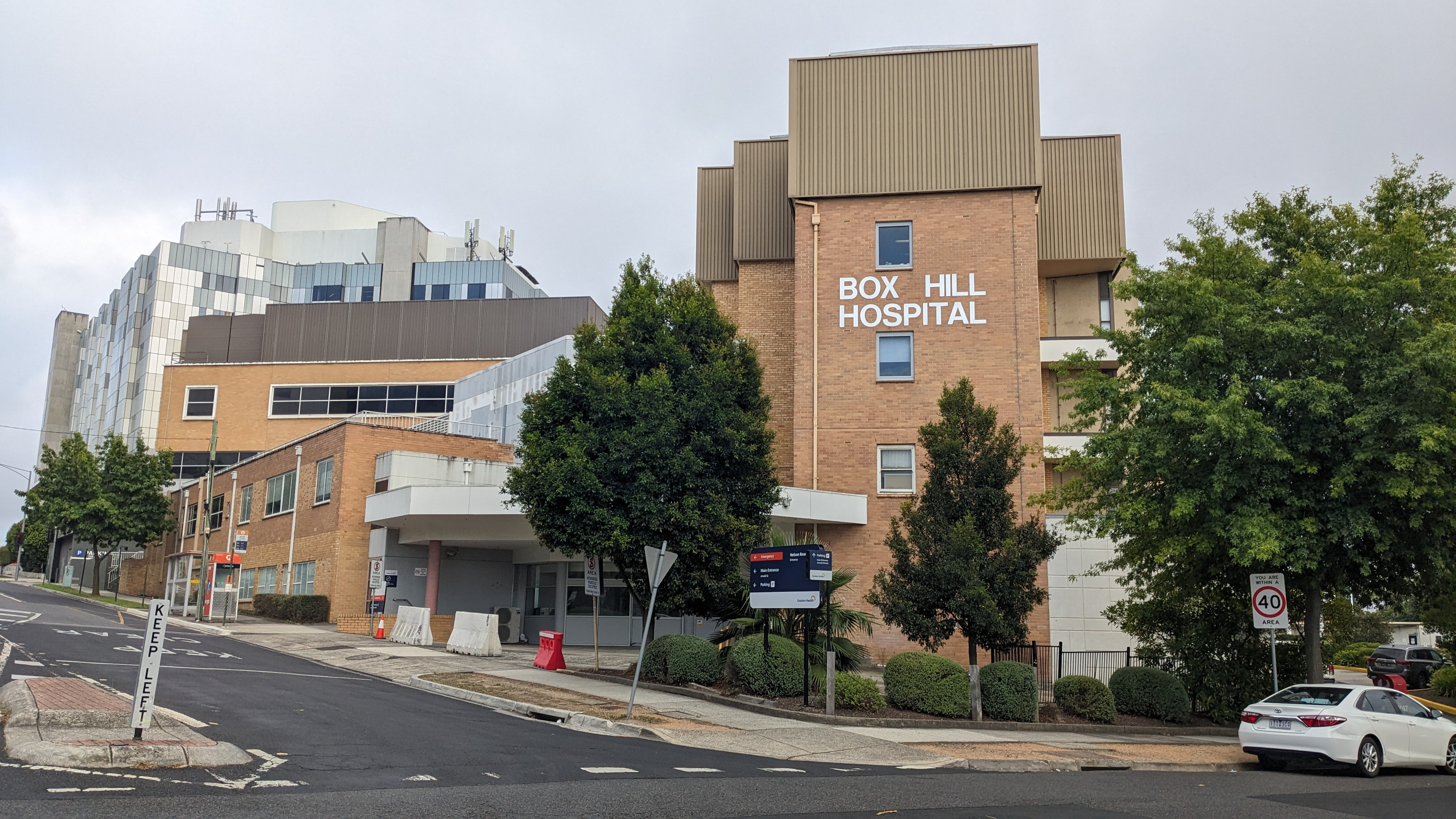
- Main buildings at Box Hill Hospital viewed from Nelson Road.

Geography
- Location: Box Hill, Victoria, Australia
- Coordinates: 37°49′00″S 145°08′00″E

Organisation
- Care system: Public Medicare (AU)
- Type: Teaching, General
- Affiliated university: Monash University, La Trobe University, Deakin University

Services
- Beds: 621

History
- Founded: 1956

Links
- Website: www.easternhealth.org.au/locations/box-hill-hospital
- Lists: Hospitals in Australia

Box Hill Hospital is a teaching hospital in Melbourne. It is one of the seven hospitals that are governed within the Eastern Health network which provides health care services across the Eastern metropolitan area of Victoria.

Established in 1956, Box Hill Hospital is a large acute hospital in the Melbourne suburb of Box Hill, which admits over 48,000 patients each year.

The hospital provides a wide range of healthcare services including: emergency care, general and specialist medicine, intensive care, mental health services for children, adolescents and adults, maternity services, post-acute care programs, surgery, teaching and research.

Box Hill Hospital is a university teaching hospital affiliated with Monash, La Trobe and Deakin Universities.

== Maternity ==
Located on Level 3 of the new 10-storey building, the service includes 10 birthing rooms (five with birthing baths), 31 post-natal beds, a special care nursery, foetal monitoring assessment area and outpatient clinics.

== Emergency ==
The new Emergency Department (entrance via Rodgerson Road) is open and the former Emergency Department (Nelson Road) is now closed.

== History ==
The idea of a local hospital to serve the Box Hill area first surfaced around 1937, with a 4.5-acre (1.8 ha) site in Nelson Road being acquired from the Rodgerson estate in 1945. Construction started in early 1949 but because of funding issues the hospital did not open until April 1956. Its original name was the Box Hill and District Hospital.

=== Redevelopment project ===
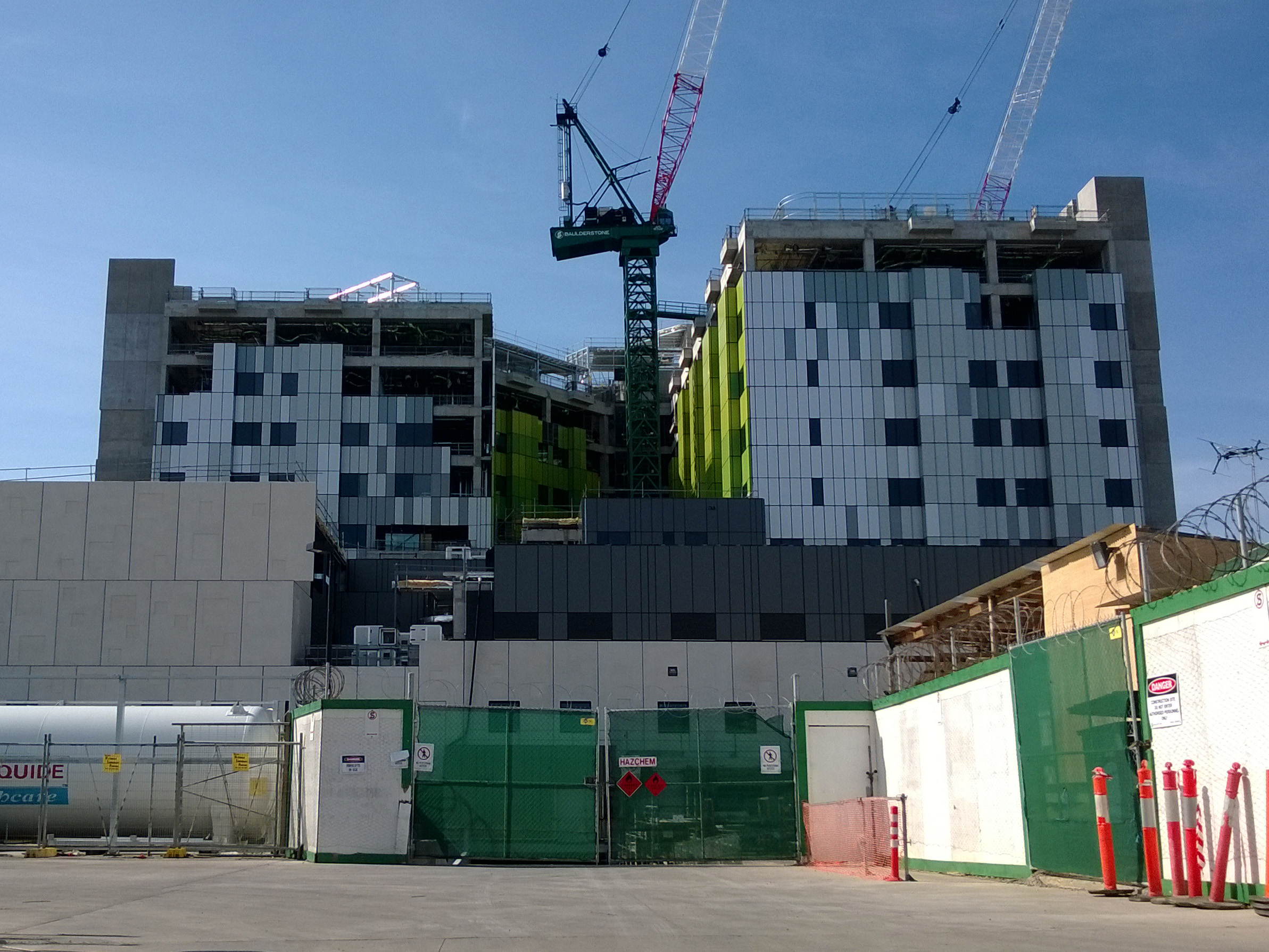
New wing of the hospital under construction in 2013.

Box Hill Hospital's new $448 million clinical services building was designed by Jackson Architecture in Association with Silver Thomas Hanley and opened by former Victorian Premier Denis Napthine in August 2014. The project was completed ahead of schedule. Patients were moved to the new building on 30 September 2014. The 10-storey Arnold St building houses the hospital's new emergency department, as well as maternity, cardiac and intensive care units. Box Hill Hospital's new 10-storey clinical services block (known as Building A) has been designed to accommodate future growth in Melbourne's east.

On 9 December 2009, the Victorian Labor government approved $407.5 million in funding for the redevelopment of the Box Hill Hospital. Plans for a new building to be constructed over the car park at the rear of the hospital and the Clive Ward building area were completed in 2014.

==== New facilities ====
- An increase of more than 200 beds
- A larger, more efficient emergency department
- A new 18-bed intensive care unit
- 10 new operating theatres, with an 11th for future expansion
- Improved women and children's services
- More inpatient and day beds for cancer and renal patients
- Two floors of basement parking to provide 212 spaces for community use.

The previous Box Hill Hospital building (known as Building B) has been refurbished to include:

- Thoroughfare between the two buildings, with a wide, contemporary open space on the ground floor connecting Building A to Building B
- Diagnostic cardiology with a direct link to the Cardiology inpatient unit in Building A
- A new contemporary endoscopy suite
- Refurbished specialist clinics

== Services ==
The Box Hill hospital provides the following services:

- Emergency care
- general and specialist medicine
- intensive care
- mental health services for children, adolescents and adults
- maternity services
- post acute care programs
- specialist surgery
- general, non-invasive, and interventional cardiology

== See also ==
- List of hospitals in Australia
- Healthcare in Australia
