= Al-Taqwa College =

Location
- 201 Sayers Road; Truganina, VIC, 3029; Australia; 37°51′14″S 144°43′19″E

Information
- Type: Independent primary and secondary school
- Motto: Quality education, for quality life.
- Denomination: Sunni Islam
- Established: June 1986
- Founder: Omar Hallak
- Principal: Omar Hallak
- Staff: 200
- Years offered: Prep–Year 12
- Gender: Co-educational
- Enrollment: 2,000
- Campus size: 51 acres
- Houses: Omar; Ali; Othman; Abu Bakar
- Colours: Blue, red, white
- Slogan: Quality Education For Quality Life
- Newspaper: Al-Hidayah
- Tuition: $2,485–$3,885
- Website: http://www.al-taqwa.vic.edu.au

The Islamic Schools of Victoria, or otherwise known as Al-Taqwa College, is a primary and secondary school located on Sayers Road, in Truganina, Victoria, outside Melbourne, Australia.

The College was built on a 50-acre property on the western side of Melbourne. The College was established by the Islamic Trust fund in 1986. The name was changed to Al-Taqwa College in 2010. Next to the main campus on Sayers Road, a mosque (masjid) was built. Al-Taqwa College is a member of Independent Schools Victoria which is a not-for-profit organisation dedicated to Independent education.

When the school was first established, classes ranged from Prep. to Year 10. As the school grew it expanded and added on VCE (Years 11 and 12). The school has another campus called the Olive Branch, which runs occasional classes in Agriculture and Horticulture. The school has a branch in Indonesia, named the Al-Taqwa College, International Islamic School of Indonesia.

Subjects taught at the college include English, Maths, Languages other than English (L.O.T.E.), Information Technology, Business, Art and Physical Education.

== Controversies ==
In 2005 there were a number of issues of concern raised involving the school, including a visiting imam's public antisemitic comments.

In 2015, the school principal Omar Hallak was reported to have told students that the terrorist group ISIS was part of a Western plot. The principal's comments were condemned as "reckless and dangerous if true" by James Merlino, Victoria's Education Minister.

== COVID-19 cases ==
During the 2020 COVID-19 pandemic in Australia, Al-Taqwa College was one of the biggest case clusters in Victoria, and the second biggest cluster outside of public housing and aged care, with 210 confirmed cases linked to the college as of mid-August.

Again in 2021, the school was closed after a teacher tested positive for COVID-19. This later lead to statewide lockdowns in Victoria.

== See also ==
- Islam in Australia
- Islamic organisations in Australia
- Islamic schools and branches
