= Royal Commission into Aged Care Quality and Safety =

Australian royal commission

- Date: 6 December 2018–1 March 2021
- Location: Australia
- Also known as: Aged Care Royal Commission
- Type: Royal Commission
- Cause: Media reporting on systemic failures and abuse in aged care
- Participants: Aged care providers, government departments, health and social work professionals and residents
- Outcome: 148 recommendations
- Commissioners: Richard Tracey; Tony Pagone; Lynelle Briggs
- Legislation: Royal Commissions Act 1902 (Cth); Letters Patent
- Website: royalcommission.gov.au/aged-care

The Royal Commission into Aged Care Quality and Safety was an Australian royal commission investigating the aged care sector following systemic failures and abuse in the sector being exposed by the Australian Broadcasting Corporation. The commission was announced on 8 October 2018 by the Morrison government, with Letters Patent issued by the Governor-General on 6 December 2018 appointing commissioners and establishing the terms of reference. The commission completed public hearings into the aged care sector over two years, with the final report being tabled in parliament on 1 March 2021.

The Commission made 148 recommendations to government, including the creation of the Aged Care Act 2024, new minimum staffing requirements, and reform to the aged care regulatory framework.

== Background ==
In February 2016, a male resident of the Oakden Older Persons Mental Health Service, located in Adelaide, South Australia, was referred to the Royal Adelaide Hospital after it was discovered that he had unexplained significant bruising to his hip. The man's family made increasingly higher level complaints about his treatment at the aged care facility, ultimately resulting in a 2018 Senate inquiry into the facility. The inquiry revealed that several incidents at the home had been referred to police, and coronial inquiries into the deaths of residents were initiated. The South Australian Independent Commission Against Corruption in 2018 reported damning findings of maladministration against five individuals and Oakden, and criticised former state mental health minister Leesa Vlahos. The Commission's report portrayed some of the most vulnerable members of society as “poorly cared for, forgotten and ignored”. Oakden closed in 2017 after it was revealed that a patient with Parkinson’s disease was beaten by another resident at the Oakden nursing home at least thirteen times between December 2016 and March 2017 and did not receive medical care, despite the matter having been reported to the Australian Aged Care Quality Agency.

On 25 July 2016, the ABC News current affairs program 7.30 broadcast hidden video camera evidence of the aggravated assault of an 89-year-old resident in September 2015. The video showed a staff member at the Mitcham Residential Care Facility eating the resident's food, flicking his face, force-feeding him, and pinning him down, prompting calls to legalise the installation of cameras in the private rooms of aged care facilities.

In early September 2018, current affairs program Four Corners broadcast a special investigation into the aged care sector and the abuse and neglect of the elderly in nursing homes. On 16 September, then-prime minister Scott Morrison announced that his government would make a recommendation to the Governor-General that a Royal Commission into aged care be established.

== Terms of reference ==
On 6 December 2018, Paul de Jersey, governor-general of Australia, issued Commonwealth Letters Patent to create the Royal Commission and establish its terms of reference. Former federal judge Richard Tracey and former Medicare chief executive Lynelle Briggs were appointed as the inaugural Royal Commissioners.

The Commissioners were appointed to be a Commission of inquiry, and required and authorised to inquire into the following matters:

(a) the quality of aged care services provided to Australians, the extent to which those services meet the needs of the people accessing them, the extent of substandard care being provided, including mistreatment and all forms of abuse, the causes of any systemic failures, and any actions that should be taken in response;
(b) how best to deliver aged care services to:

i. people with disabilities residing in aged care facilities, including younger people; and
ii. the increasing number of Australians living with dementia, having regard to the importance of dementia care for the future of aged care services;

(c) the future challenges and opportunities for delivering accessible, affordable and high quality aged care services in Australia, including:

i. in the context of changing demographics and preferences, in particular people's desire to remain living at home as they age; and
ii. in remote, rural and regional Australia;

(d) what the Australian Government, aged care industry, Australian families and the wider community can do to strengthen the system of aged care services to ensure that the services provided are of high quality and safe;
(e) how to ensure that aged care services are person‑centred, including through allowing people to exercise greater choice, control and independence in relation to their care, and improving engagement with families and carers on care‑related matters;
(f) how best to deliver aged care services in a sustainable way, including through innovative models of care, increased use of technology, and investment in the aged care workforce and capital infrastructure;
(g) any matter reasonably incidental to a matter referred to in paragraphs (a) to (f) or that [the Commissioners] believe is reasonably relevant to the inquiry.

== Commissioners and executive ==
The Honourable Justice Joseph McGrath and Ms Lynelle Briggs AO were appointed as Royal Commissioners with effect from 8 October 2018. However, Justice McGrath stood aside for family reasons and, on 11 December 2018, the Australian Government announced that former Federal Court judge, The Honourable Richard Tracey AM RFD QC, would replace McGrath. Justice Tracey died in California on 11 October 2019, while undergoing treatment for cancer he had been diagnosed with seven weeks earlier. Tony Pagone replaced Tracey as chair of the commission.

The Official Secretary to the Royal Commission is Dr James Popple. Counsel assisting the Commissioners are Mr Peter Gray QC, Dr Timothy McEvoy QC, Ms Eliza Bergin, Mr Paul Bolster, Ms Erin Hill and Ms Brooke Hutchins. The Australian Government Solicitor are Solicitors Assisting.

== Powers ==
The powers of Royal Commissions in Australia are set out in the enabling legislation, the Royal Commissions Act 1902 (Cth).

The Royal Commissions Amendment Act 2013 was approved by Parliament to give the Child Abuse Royal Commission additional powers to fulfil its terms of reference. Notable changes were:

1. Enabling the Chair to authorise one or more members to hold a public or private hearing
2. Authorise members of the Royal Commission to hold private sessions

Royal Commissions, appointed pursuant to the Royal Commissions Act or otherwise, have powers to issue a summons to a person to appear before the Commission at a hearing to give evidence or to produce documents specified in the summons; require witnesses to take an oath or give an affirmation; and require a person to deliver documents to the Commission at a specified place and time. A person served with a summons or a notice to produce documents must comply with that requirement, or face prosecution for an offence. The penalty for conviction upon such an offence is a fine of A$1,000 or six months imprisonment. A Royal Commission may authorise the Australian Federal Police to execute search warrants.

== Final report ==
The federal government requested that the Commissioners provide an interim report by 31 October 2019, and a final report by 30 April 2020. The final report was tabled on 1 March 2021.

=== Recommendations ===
The Royal Commission made 148 recommendations in its final report, calling for significant reforms throughout the entire aged care sector.

== See also ==
- Aged care in Australia
- List of Australian royal commissions
