= Footscray Hospital =

- Western Health
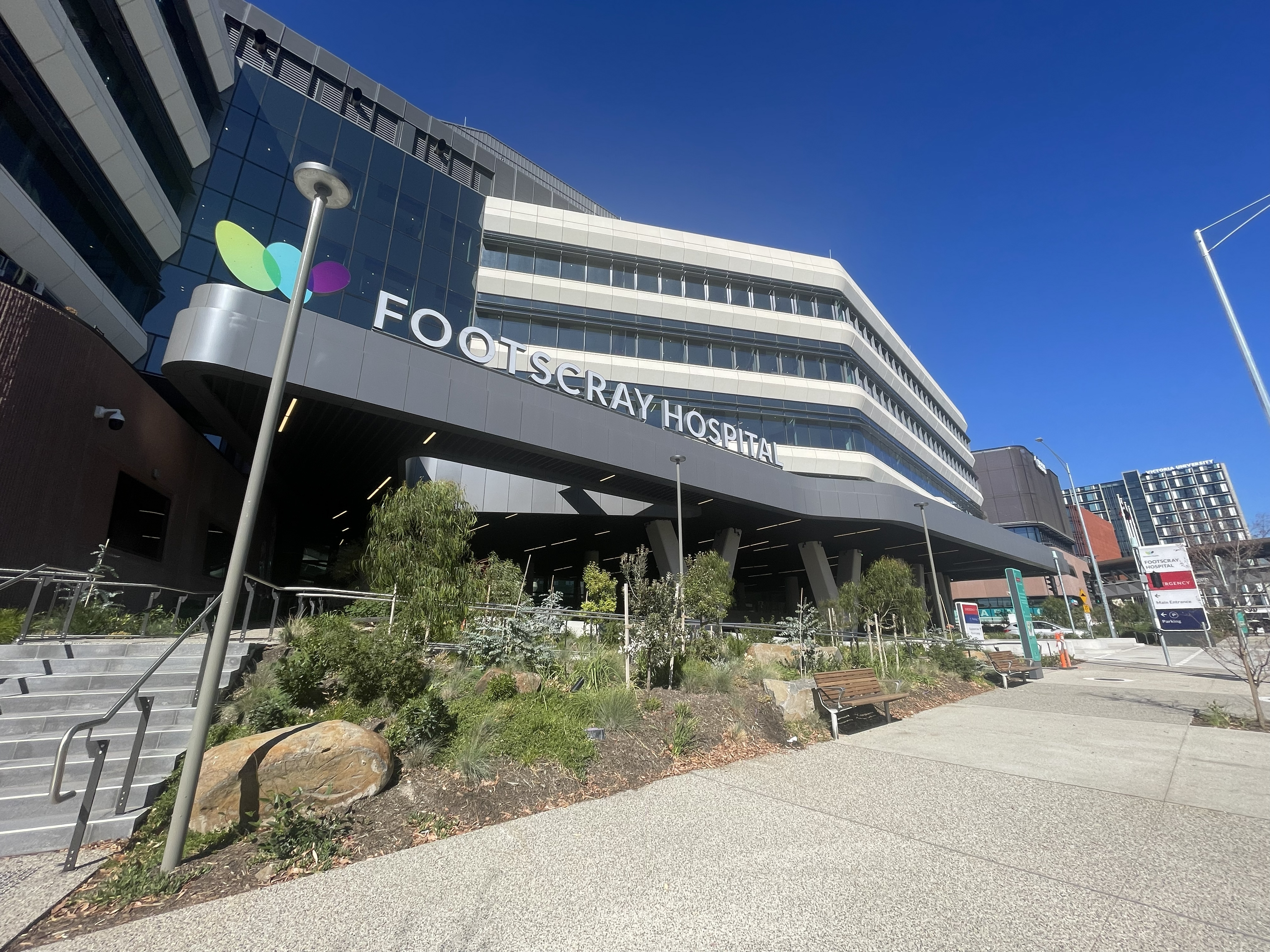
- Footscray Hospital in February 2026

Geography
- Location: 89 Ballarat Road, Footscray, Victoria, Australia
- Coordinates: 37.7939928°S 144.8982738°E

Organisation
- Care system: Medicare
- Type: General
- Affiliated university: The University of Melbourne; Victoria University

Services
- Emergency department: Yes
- Beds: 504

Helipads
- Helipad: No

History
- Founded: 1953

Footscray Hospital is a public hospital located on Ballarat Road in Footscray, an inner-western suburb of Melbourne, Australia. It is one of three major hospitals operated by Western Health in the western suburbs of Melbourne.

== History ==
Footscray Hospital was opened in 1953 as Footscray and District Hospital, with 213 beds and the first hospital in the state to be fully air-conditioned. The construction of the hospital came as a result of 32 years of lobbying by the community surrounding the area, with a successful fundraiser to purchase the site occurring in 1921. However, the Charities' Board refused permission to build the hospital three years later in 1924. In the same year, an Outpatients Clinic, Dispensary and Casualty Station was established.

In 1941, the Charities' Board approved the construction of a 30-bed hospital but events of World War II meant construction would not began until later in 1947.

In 1972, the hospital was renamed to Western General and a new Outpatients complex was constructed in 1976.

In 1986, the hospital was amalgamated with Sunshine Hospital to form the Maribyrnong Medical Centre. This name would later be renamed to Western Hospital in 1989.

Throughout the 1990s, the hospital went through a period of expansion with new facilities such as a new emergency department and Community Drug and Alcohol Services unit.

It was renamed to Footscray Hospital in 2014.

The Hospital was described as 'run down' and 'past its use-by date' in local media and community. As a result, the Victorian state government announced in its 2017 budget that a new Footscray Hospital would be constructed adjacent to Victoria University, Melbourne with more modern facilities and reduced waiting times.

Construction of the new hospital was completed in late 2025, with the hospital opening on 18 February 2026. Due to the closure of the old hospital, the Victorian Government has sought community consultation on the future of the 6.6 hectare site of the old hospital on Gordon St.

== Facilities ==
The hospital has approximately 504 beds, with a possibility of future expansion to 606 beds total. This includes an emergency department, an intensive care unit, a cardiac care unit, general medicine, surgery, cancer services, adult specialist clinics (outpatients).

Footscray Hospital is part of the Western Clinical School at the Melbourne Medical School alongside Sunshine Hospital.
