= Queensland Community Care Network =

Australian charity

Queensland Community Care Network Inc. (QCCN) is a charity organisation based in Queensland, Australia. QCCN was established in June 1990 to provide broad-based community services directly to people requiring some level of community or home support.

QCCN acknowledges that the personal care of the elderly can become a source of stress to both the person involved and their carers. Preservation of the health and well being of elderly people is the key to preventing premature or inappropriate institutionalisation. QCCN helps to assist people to maintain a normal lifestyle.

QCCN contributes to two main programs to help elderly Australians, the "Aged Care Volunteer Visitors Scheme" and the "100+ Club".

== Aged Care Volunteer Visitors Scheme ==
The Aged Care Volunteer Visitors Scheme (ACVVS) is an initiative of the Australian Federal Government, managed by the Department of Health (Australia). The target group of the ACVVS is isolated residents of the ageing population whose quality of life would be improved by the friendship and companionship achieved by having volunteers visit them on a one-to-one basis.

Since 1990 Queensland Community Care Network along with a number of other organisations has been funded to manage the Aged Care Volunteer Visitors Scheme in Queensland.

== 100+ Club ==
The 100+ Club was formed in 1993 and is the only known club of its type in the world. It is an exclusive club available on a non-religious, non-racial, non-class basis – the only condition of membership is that a person be aged 100 years or older. The Current Premier of Queensland is the patron of the 100+ Club.

The club was formed by the Queensland Community Care Network to highlight one of the unique aspects of ageing – the large number of people aged 100 years or over. During the QCCN’s work in aged care facilities in Queensland, large numbers of people aged 100 years and older were identified, many with few peers to reminisce with.

These rare and unique people were largely isolated in age care facilities, frequently with no social activities, despite having good general health. Many of them felt, because of their isolation, that they were alone as centenarians. The objectives of the first functions put together on behalf of the 100+ Club was to improve their quality of life and to give them an opportunity to mix with people. Today, the 100+ Club solely exists to provide centenarians with people their own age to socialise with.

== See also ==
- Aged care
