= Regis Healthcare =

Australian aged care operator

Regis Healthcare Limited
- Company type: Public company
- Traded as: ASX: REG
- Industry: Aged care, Healthcare services
- Founded: 1994 (as Fairway Investment Holdings Pty Ltd)
- Founder: Ian Roberts, Bryan Dorman
- Headquarters: Level 2, 293 Camberwell Road, Camberwell, Victoria, Australia
- Area served: Australia
- Key people: Rick Rostolis (CFO); Graham Hodges (Chair)
- Products: Residential aged care, home care, day therapy/respite, retirement villages
- Revenue: A$1.01 billion (FY 2024)
- Number of employees: Approx. 12,000
- Website: www.regis.com.au

Regis Healthcare Ltd is an Australian aged care operator listed on the Australian Securities Exchange. Not to be confused with the Welsh company of the same name.

On 2 March 2018 the Federal Court of Australia decided that its Asset Replacement Charge was not consistent with the Aged Care Act 1997. These charges were intended to “fund reinstatements of fixtures, fittings and infrastructure, rebuilding and construction of, or at, Regis’s residential care facilities.”

The company lost about a sixth of its value in September 2018 when the government announced a public inquiry into misconduct in the aged care sector and the Australian Broadcasting Corporation produced a two-part documentary focusing on alleged neglect and abuse of older people.
