= Estia Health =

Australian public company

- Industry: Aged care provider
- Founder: Peter Arvanitis
- Parent: Bain Capital
- Website: estiahealth.com

Estia Health is an Australian aged care operator floated by Quadrant Private Equity in December 2014 when it was valued at $725 million.

It operates 75 facilities across Australia and is listed on the Australian Securities Exchange.

== History ==
It was founded by Peter Arvanitis. He resigned in 2016.

In 2018 it had the largest proportion of women in its executive team. The company lost about a sixth of its value in September 2018 when the government announced a public inquiry into misconduct in the aged care sector, following the Australian Broadcasting Corporation produced a two-part documentary focusing on alleged neglect and abuse of older people.

Estia Health was a public company traded on the Australian Securities Exchange until December 2023 when it was taken private by Bain Capital for $551.3 million.

== Acquisitions ==
It acquired 4 residential aged care homes and two development sites worth more than $100m from Premier Health Care Group in 2022. They will add 409 resident places to their portfolio and two development sites could deliver a further 160-179.

== See also ==
- Heritage Care
