= Sunshine Hospital =

- Western Health

Geography
- Location: St Albans, Victoria, Australia
- Coordinates: 37.760°S 144.815°E

Organisation
- Care system: Medicare
- Type: General
- Affiliated university: The University of Melbourne & Victoria University

Services
- Emergency department: Yes

Helipads
- Helipad: No

History
- Founded: 1989

Links
- Lists: Hospitals in Australia

Sunshine Hospital is a public hospital located on Furlong Road in St Albans, a suburb of Melbourne, Australia. It is one of three major hospitals operated by Western Health in the western suburbs of Melbourne. The hospital takes its name from the major suburb of Sunshine near which it is located.

== History ==
The first hospital around Sunshine was established in the 1920s by two nursing sisters at 9 King Edward Avenue, Albion, and was called St Andrews, with 14 beds. It was renamed Sunshine and District Community Hospital in 1946, and was then managed with the then Western General Hospital located in Eleanor Street, Footscray, to become the Maribyrnong Medical Centre. Western General Hospital has been founded in 1853 was later renamed Footscray Hospital in 1989. A psychiatric facility, The Footscray Psychiatric Hospital has been opened nearby in the 1970's.

In 1989, the small Sunshine and District Community Hospital at King Edward Avenue was demolished and replaced by the extensive new Sunshine Hospital on Furlong Road in St Albans. In 1996, together with Footscray Hospital and Williamstown Hospital, Sunshine Hospital became part of the Western Health Care Network, which was expanded in 1997 to become the North Western Health Care Network, and then reduced in size in 2000 to become Western Health, with the concurrent creation of Northern Health.

In 2015, a 13-bed intensive care unit was opened at the hospital. A specialist women's and children's hospital, called the Joan Kirner Women's and Children's Hospital, opened on the Sunshine Hospital site in May 2019. It includes maternity and post-natal facilities.

== Facilities ==
The hospital has approximately 600 beds. This includes an emergency department, an intensive care unit, a cardiac care unit, women's and children's facilities, and mental health wards, along with aged care and rehabilitation facilities.

== Performance ==
The Sunshine Hospital emergency department processes more than 200 patients on average daily, with about 60 ambulances and 160 patients otherwise presented. As a consequence of this high volume, the hospital has the worst-performing emergency department of the three operated by Western Health, with the lowest rates of patients seen within the recommended four-hour time. The introduction of an intensive care unit in 2015 significantly increased the number of emergency presentations at Sunshine.

In 2014, 5230 babies were born at the hospital, making it the third-busiest maternity hospital in Victoria. This number is expected to rise to 7000 by 2026 in line with high growth in the western suburbs of Melbourne.

In 2016, Sunshine Hospital was ranked the third-best hospital in Melbourne for its efficiency in dealing with severe medical conditions in a report by the Auditor-General of Victoria.
