= Japara Healthcare =

- Founded: 2005
- Headquarters: Australia
- Parent: Calvary Health Care

Japara Healthcare was an Australian aged care provider that operated residential aged care homes and retirement villages across the country. It was listed on the Australian Securities Exchange until November 2021, when it was acquired by Calvary Health Care and its operations were rebranded under the Calvary Health Care name.

== History ==
Japara Healthcare was established in 2005 and operated more than 50 residential aged care homes and several retirement villages in multiple Australian states.

In March 2018, the company acquired the Riviera Health residential aged care portfolio, comprising four facilities located at Brighton-Le-Sands, Chatswood, Doonside and Wyong, as well as a closed facility in Toukley.

In 2021, Japara entered into a Scheme of Arrangement with Calvary Health Care. The acquisition, valued at approximately AUD 380 million, was approved by shareholders and the Federal Court in November 2021.

Following completion of the transaction, Japara’s residential aged care homes and retirement villages were rebranded as Calvary and integrated into Calvary Health Care’s broader national network of hospitals, aged care, retirement living and home care services.
