= Timeline of the COVID-19 pandemic in Australia (2020) =

COVID-19 pandemic in Australia

This article documents the chronology and epidemiology of SARS-CoV-2, the virus which causes the coronavirus disease 2019 (COVID-19) and is responsible for the COVID-19 pandemic in Australia during 2020.

The first human case of COVID-19 in Australia was identified in Melbourne in January 2020.

== January 2020 ==
On 23 January, biosecurity officials began screening arrivals on flights from Wuhan to Sydney. Passengers were given an information sheet and asked to present themselves if they had a fever or suspect they might have the disease.

On 25 January, the first case of a SARS-CoV-2 infection was reported, that of a Chinese citizen who arrived from Guangzhou on 19 January. The patient was tested and received treatment in Melbourne. On the same day, three other patients tested positive in Sydney after returning from Wuhan.

Nine cases were recorded in January. From 31 January, foreign nationals returning from China were required to have spent a fortnight in a third country before being allowed into Australia.

== February 2020 ==
By 6 February, three returning members from a tour group in Wuhan were identified in Queensland.

Twenty-four Australians were infected on the Diamond Princess cruise ship with eight being sent to Darwin for two weeks of quarantine. The number repatriated from the ship are included in the state totals as follows: Qld (3), SA (1), Vic (4), WA (2, one of whom died on 1 March).

On 27 February, the prime minister activated the Australian Health Sector Emergency Response Plan for Novel Coronavirus (COVID-19), stating that the rapid spread of the virus outside of China had prompted the government to elevate its response.

On 29 February, after a Queensland case of an infected person returning to Australia from Iran, the government extended the enforced quarantine to people who had been in Iran, requiring them to spend a fortnight in a third country before being allowed into Australia. There were 14 new cases in February, bringing the number of cases to 23.

== March 2020 ==
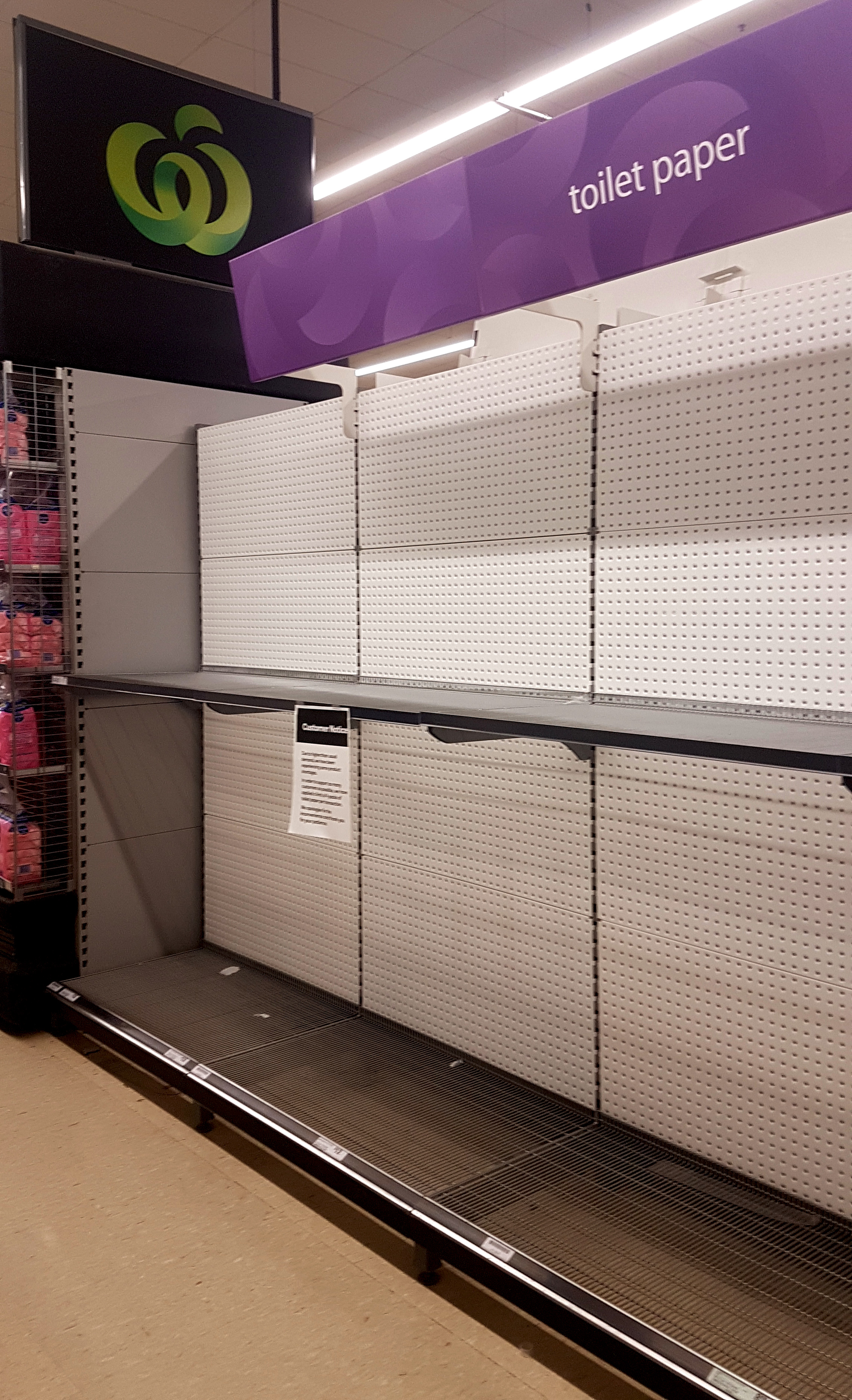
The coronavirus COVID-19 outbreak resulted in panic buying (particularly of toilet paper), leading to empty shelves as seen here on 4 March 2020 in the Adelaide suburb of Paralowie, South Australia.

=== Week 1 ===
On 1 March, Australia reported the first death from COVID-19: a 78-year-old Perth man, who was one of the passengers from Diamond Princess, and who had been evacuated and was being treated in Western Australia.

On 2 March, four new cases were reported, two of which were the first cases of community transmission of the virus. These two cases were acquired in Australia whereas all other previous cases were imported from another country. The two cases were in New South Wales: one was acquired from a close relative and the other was a health care worker in Western Sydney. Another confirmed case on this day was a 40-year-old man from Launceston who came back on 29 February from a flight which left Melbourne and landed in Launceston on the same day. He was treated at the Launceston General Hospital as he became the first COVID-19 case in Tasmania.

On 4 March, a second death was reported, a 95-year-old woman dying at a Sydney aged-care facility.

On 7 March, Victorian Health Minister Jenny Mikakos confirmed during a press conference that a doctor in Victoria had tested positive for COVID-19. The doctor in his 70s had returned to Australia from the United States on 29 February. From 2 to 6 March, the doctor had consulted approximately 70 patients at The Toorak Clinic in Melbourne and two patients at an aged-care facility. The clinic was closed over the weekend and patients were contacted to self-isolate. Health officials sought to notify passengers on the doctor's flights. The doctor believed he only had a mild cold and was fit to return to work, hitting back at the minister for her comments.

=== Week 2 ===
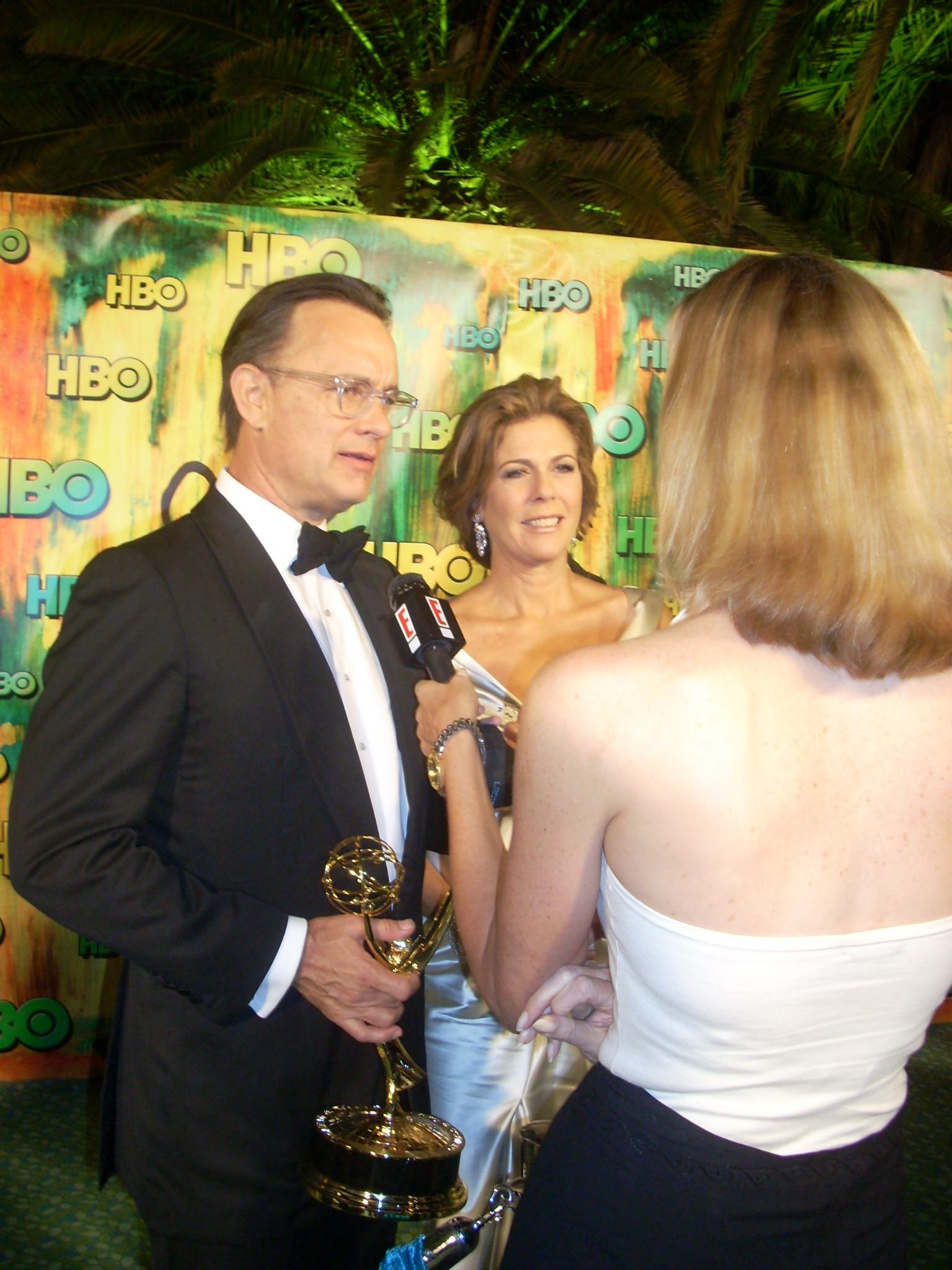
Tom Hanks and Rita Wilson made international headlines in March 2020 after being hospitalised with the virus in Queensland. (Photo taken after the 2008 Emmys in California.)

On 8 March, an 82-year-old man died, becoming the second death at the Dorothy Henderson Lodge aged-care facility and the third death in the country.

On 9 March, the principal of Carey Baptist Grammar confirmed that one of the teachers at their Kew campus was infected with the virus. This teacher, a woman in her 50s, was confirmed to be the partner of an individual who was on the same flight from the US that the general practitioner (GP) of Toorak Clinic was on.

On 11 March, the head of the Museum of Old and New Art (MONA), David Walsh, cancelled the MONA FOMA winter arts festival Dark Mofo. In a statement, David Walsh stated "I know that [the cancellation] will murder an already massacred tourism environment, but I feel like I have no choice."

On 12 March, the ACT announced its first case, the 142nd case in Australia. A man in his 30s had not travelled overseas but did travel outside of the ACT. Actor Tom Hanks and his wife Rita Wilson advised that they had tested positive and were in isolation.

Later that day, an initial $17.6 billion stimulus package was unveiled by the Prime Minister to "protect Australians' health, secure jobs and set the economy to bounce back" from the crisis. West Australian health minister Roger Cook has informed the public that the Western Australian Department of health is postponing upgrades at Peel Health Campus to accommodate patients with the virus. There were concerns that the upgrade would temporarily halve the Emergency Department (ED) waiting room capacity, preventing isolation of ED patients from patients with the virus. The upgrade has been postponed to 1 October 2020.

Victoria confirmed nine new cases, one of which was the first case of human-to-human transmission in the state. A McLaren Formula One team member on the now-cancelled Australian Grand Prix tested positive for the virus. This brought the Victorian total to 36 and the national total to 175. The Victorian government declared they are suspending all jury trials to limit the spread of the virus. Home Affairs Minister Peter Dutton tested positive in Queensland on 13 March.

=== Week 3 ===
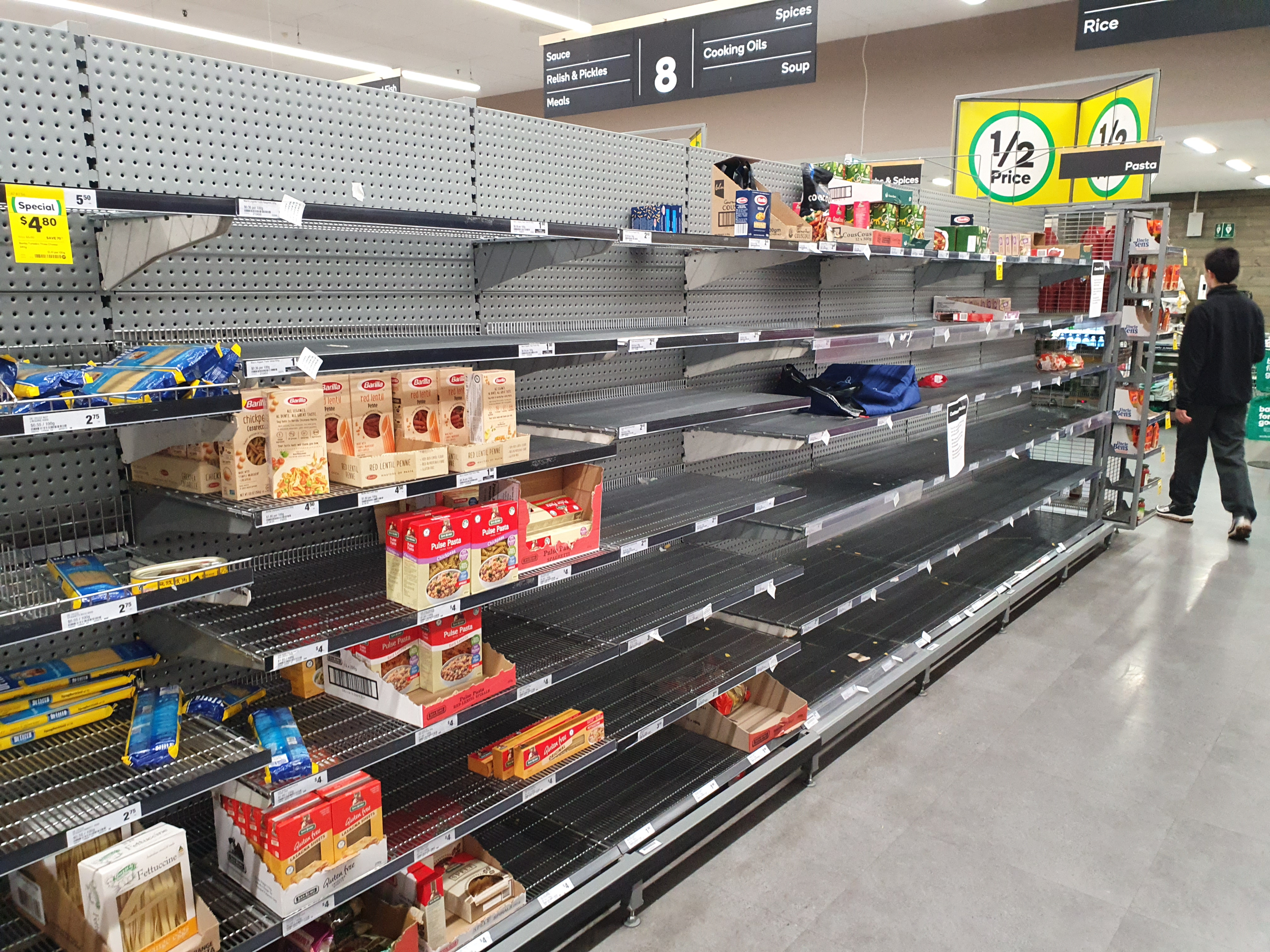
Shortage of non-perishable foods at a Melbourne supermarket

On 10 March, Victorian Premier Daniel Andrews warned Victorians to expect "extreme measures" in the wake of the federal government updating the travel advice for Italy. These could include cancelling major sporting events, requiring entire economic sectors to work from home, and calling recently retired health professionals to return to work.

On 16 March, Victorian Premier Daniel Andrews declared a state of emergency until 13 April. A State of Emergency in the External Territory of Norfolk Island was declared the following day (its second State of Emergency in two days). Covid States of Emergency were subsequently extended.

Also on 16 March, the 2020 National Folk Festival in Canberra was cancelled.

The University of Queensland stopped all teaching for the week after three students tested positive for the virus. Western Australia introduced similar measures as New South Wales, preventing schools from organising gatherings of over 500. Susan McDonald, a Queensland senator, confirmed being infected with the virus. New South Wales Liberal senator, Andrew Bragg, was the third Australian politician to test positive.

On 17 March, the New South Wales government announced a A$2.3 billion stimulus package, including A$700 million for health services. A$450 million was allocated to waive payroll tax for 3 months. A$250 million so state-owned buildings and public schools could employ more cleaners. A$750 million was allocated for capital works and public asset maintenance.

On 18 March, a human biosecurity emergency was declared by the Governor-General of Australia, David Hurley, under Section 475 of the Biosecurity Act 2015.

Also on 18 March, the cruise ship Ovation of the Seas docked in Sydney and discharged about 3,500 passengers. 79 passengers had tested positive for the virus by 1 April. Voyager of the Seas also docked that day. By 2 April, 34 passengers and 5 crew members had tested positive for the virus in New South Wales alone.

Still on 18 March, the Northern Territory government announced an economic stimulus package of A$60 million.

On 18 March in Tasmania the Agfest agricultural field day, set for 7–9 May, was cancelled and replaced by an online event that ran from 7–28 May,

On 19 March, Celebrity Solstice docked and contributed a further 11 cases to NSW figures by 2 April. On the same day, the cruise ship Ruby Princess discharged 2,700 passengers in Sydney. It was announced on 20 March that three of 13 passengers had tested positive for the coronavirus. New South Wales health authorities asked all passengers to go into self-isolation.

Also on 19 March, Qantas confirmed it would suspend about 60% of domestic flights, put two-thirds of its employees on leave, suspend all international flights and ground more than 150 of its aircraft from the end of March until at least 31 May 2020 following expanded government travel restrictions in response to COVID-19.

On 22 March the federal government announced a second stimulus package of A$66 billion, increasing the amount of total financial package offered to A$89 billion. This included several new measures; most notably a Coronavirus Supplement of an extra A$550 per fortnight of income support, relaxed eligibility criteria for individuals on Jobseeker Payment (formerly Newstart), and grants of up to A$100,000 for small and medium-sized businesses.

=== Week 4 ===
On 24 March, one passenger from Ruby Princess had died and 133 on the ship had tested positive. On 28 March 284 passengers had tested positive.

On 25 March, the National COVID-19 Coordination Commission (NCCC) was established by the Prime Minister, as a strategic advisory body for the national response to the pandemic. The NCCC's role includes providing advice on public-private partnerships and coordination to mitigate the social and economic impacts of the pandemic. From 12 pm on this day, Australia required that Australian citizens and permanent residents seek exemptions to leave the country. On 27 July, the Prime Minister renamed the NCCC, to the "National COVID-19 Commission Advisory Board" (NCC) to better reflect the advisory nature of the body.

=== Week 5 ===
The cruise ship Artania docked at Fremantle on 27 March. Most of the 850 passengers flew home from Perth to Germany on 28–29 March. 41 passengers and crew tested positive to COVID-19 and were being treated in Perth hospitals. When the cruise departed on 18 April 79 of Western Australia's 541 cases were passengers and crew off the Artania with one death acknowledged as being a crew member from the Philippines.

As of 30 March, at least 440 passengers (211 in New South Wales, 71 in South Australia, 70 in Queensland, 43 in Western Australia, 22 in the Australian Capital Territory, 18 in Victoria, three in Tasmania and two in the Northern Territory) from Ruby Princess had tested positive for the virus. As of 31 March 2020, five of them had died, one in the Australian Capital Territory, two in Tasmania, one in New South Wales and one in Queensland.

The same day, the Australian Government announced its largest economic support package in response to the crisis, a $130 billion "JobKeeper" wage subsidy program. This figure was later revised to $70 billion when an error of estimation came to light. The JobKeeper program would pay employers up to $1500 a fortnight per full-time, part-time or casual employee that has worked for that business for over a year, if the business fits criteria involving a loss of turnover as a result of the pandemic.

On the evening of 31 March, six baggage handlers from Adelaide Airport had tested positive. As a result, up to 100 other staff from the airport were required to self-isolate, causing cancellations of flights to and from Adelaide.

== April 2020 ==
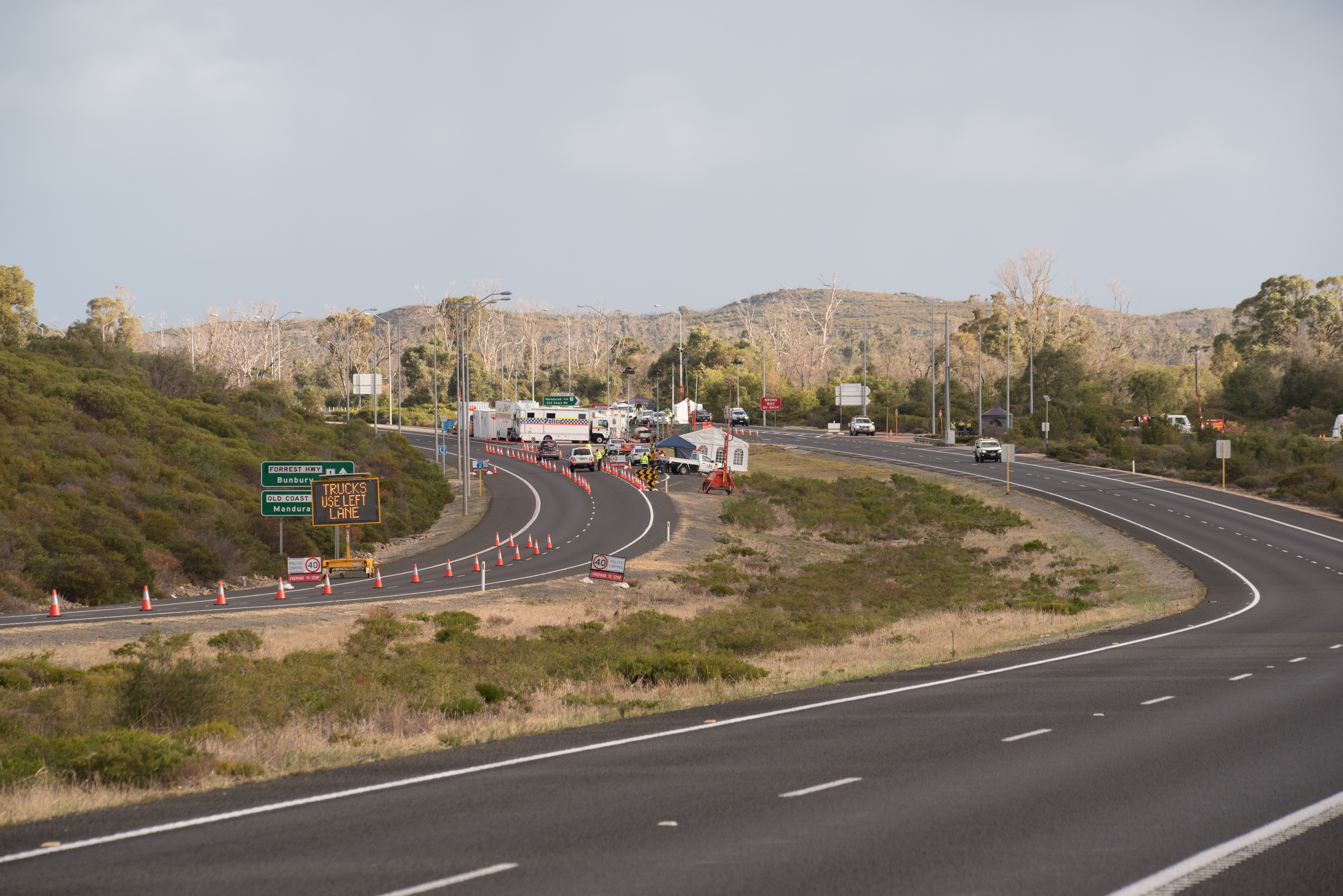
Forrest highway, Perth-Peel region checkpoint for entering the South West region

On 1 April, the Western Australian State Government introduced intrastate travel restriction, limiting movements between the regions of Western Australia.

On 2 April, the number of cases in Victoria exceeded 1,000, including over 100 healthcare workers.

Also on 2 April, the Federal government announced the temporary provision of free childcare so that people could continue working, and to prevent closure of childcare centres. The Government will pay half each centre's operating costs. The free childcare ended on 12 July, and the previous Child Care Subsidy was reintroduced.

On 5 April, New South Wales Police Force launched a criminal investigation into whether the operator of Ruby Princess, Carnival Australia, broke the Biosecurity Act 2015 (Cwth) and New South Wales state laws, by deliberately concealing COVID-19 cases.

On 5 April, the Queen of Australia addressed the Commonwealth in a televised broadcast, in which she asked people to "take comfort that while we may have more still to endure, better days will return". She added, "we will be with our friends again; we will be with our families again; we will meet again".

On 6 April, the Department of Health revealed that 2,432 people recovered from the infection as the federal government started reporting recovery statistics. This is more than a third from the official number reported so far, Deputy Chief Medical Officer Professor Paul Kelly stating, "I think it is important. Firstly it really reinforces that message, which is a true one, that most people who get this disease do recover". The day before, at 3 pm, it was announced that 2,315 of the 5,687 confirmed coronavirus cases had recovered.

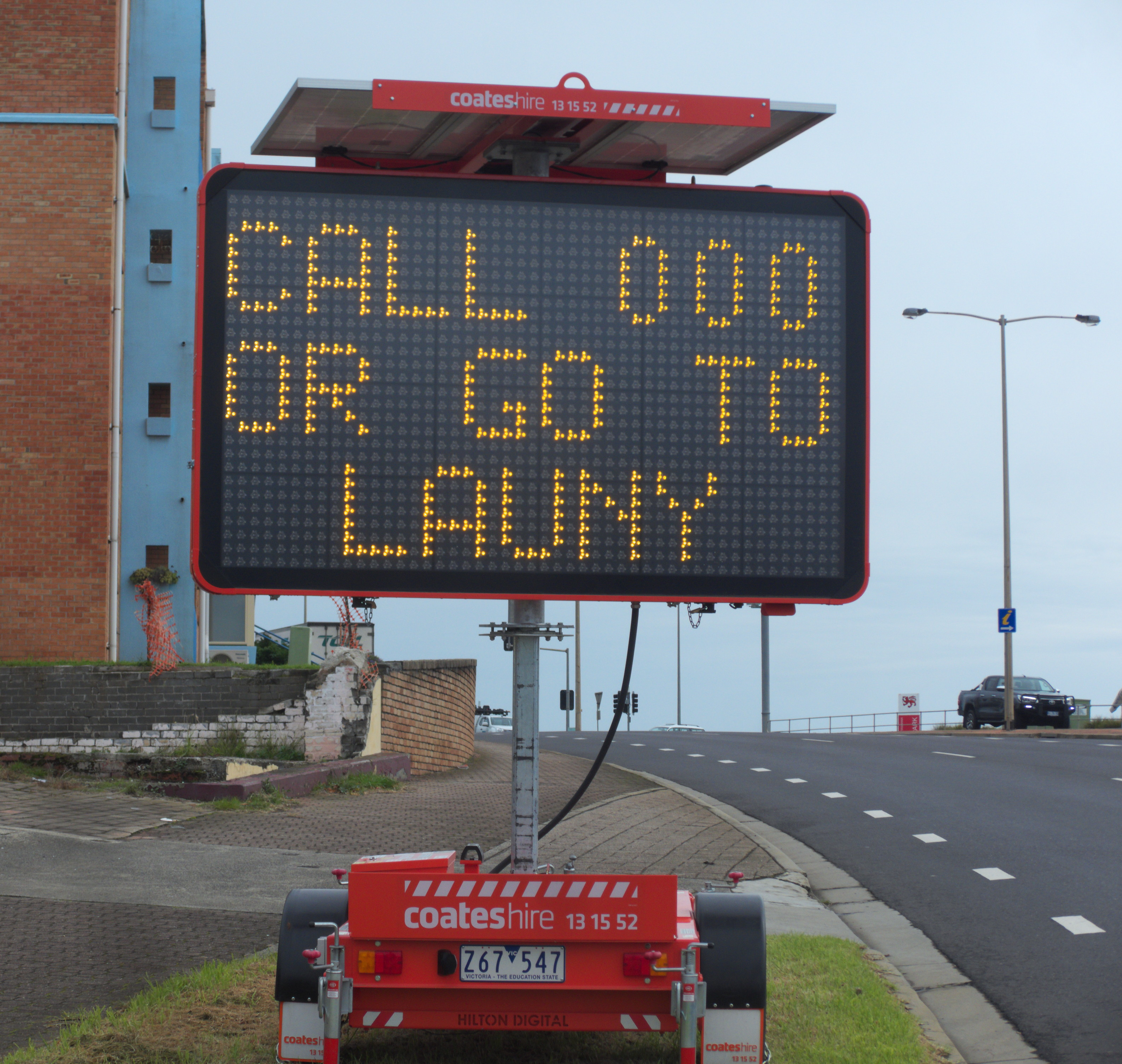
Roadside hospital advice in Burnie, Tasmania, telling people to call emergency services or head to Launceston General Hospital.

On 11 April, the charity Anglicare was advised of an outbreak at its Newmarch House aged care nursing home in Caddens, New South Wales. On 14 April, the outbreak was linked to an infected staff member with minor symptoms, but who attended work for six shifts. Ten residents and five other staff tested positive for coronavirus. On 27 and 28 April, four residents of the home died in less than 24 hours, bringing to eleven the number of residents who had died from COVID-19 since 11 April. By 9 May, there had been 69 COVID-19 cases linked to the facility, 32 staff and 37 residents. On 19 May, the 19th resident died from coronavirus.

Also on 11 April, the South Australian state government announced its own A$350 million COVID-19 related economic stimulus measures.

On 13 April, the Tasmanian government closed the North West Regional Hospital and North West Private Hospital for cleaning, and put the entire staff of over 1,000 people and their families into quarantine.

On 14 April the Federal government announced the "COVIDSafe" digital contact tracing app.

On 15 April, a Western Australian man became the first person in Australia to be jailed for breaking a self-isolation directive.

On 27 April, the Federal government announced A$94.6 million of support was available for zoos, wildlife parks and aquariums in financial difficulties due to coronavirus restrictions.

On 30 April 2020, the ACT declared itself to be free of all known cases of COVID-19, the first Australian jurisdiction. However, on 4 May there was a one new case, a young woman who acquired the virus overseas. On 10 May, the ACT was again free of active COVID-19 cases.

== May 2020 ==
An outbreak in Victoria at a meatworks, later revealed to be Cedar Meats, was announced on 2 May with eight cases. By 8 May, the cluster of cases linked to Cedar Meats in Victoria was 71, consisting of at least 57 workers and 13 close contacts, including a nurse, aged care worker and high school student. The number had increased to 75 by 9 May, 88 by 13 May, and 90 by 14 May.

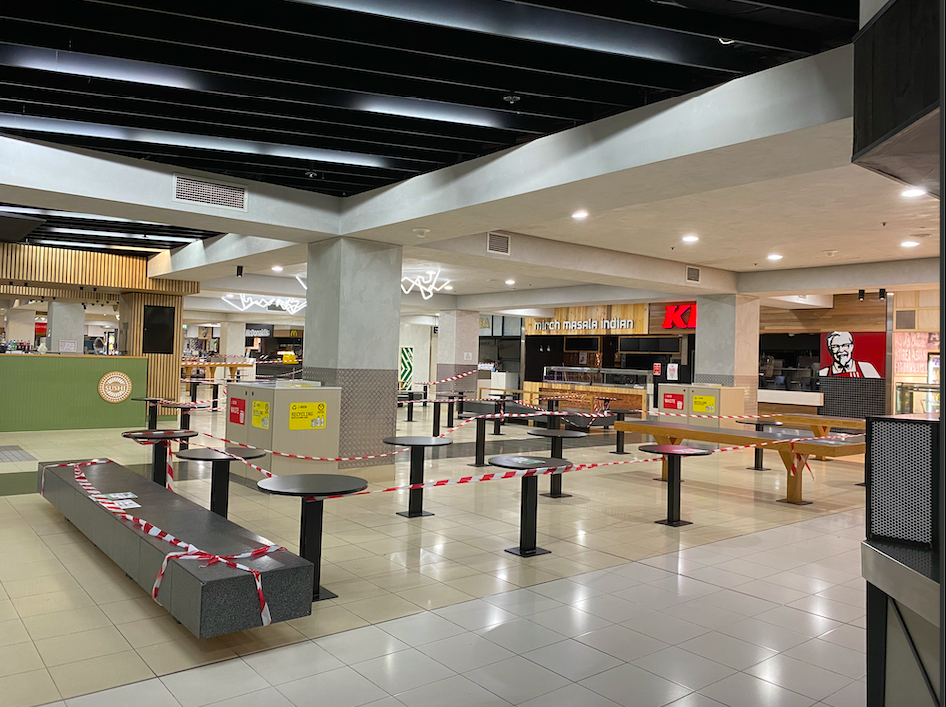
Adelaide's Myer Centre food court closed due to the pandemic.

On 9 May, two Victorian cases were announced to be related to McDonald's Fawkner. By 18 May, this had increased to 12 cases, and on that day it was revealed that a delivery driver had tested positive, prompting the closing for cleaning of 12 more McDonald's locations: Melton East, Laverton North, Yallambie, Taylors Lakes, Campbellfield, Sunbury, Hoppers Crossing, Riverdale Village, Sandown, Calder Highway Northbound/Outbound, Calder Highway Southbound/Inbound, and BP Rockbank Service Centre Outbound.

As of 15 May in New South Wales, some restrictions on public gatherings were eased. After being restricted to take-away only since March, free standing cafes and restaurants, and those inside pubs and clubs, were allowed some sit-down dining. Bars and gaming areas remained closed. Ten people were permitted in restaurants and cafes, social distancing rules still had to be followed. Outdoor gatherings of up to 10 people were allowed. Up to 10 guests were permitted at weddings, funerals could have up to 20 mourners indoors, 30 outdoors. Up to 10 people were allowed at indoor religious gatherings.

On 15 May, South Australia became the second jurisdiction, after the ACT, to be free of any active cases; however, on 26 May, a woman returning from overseas who was granted exemption into South Australia from her hotel quarantine in Victoria tested positive for COVID-19. This was the first new case in 19 days for the state. On 4 June, it was announced that the woman had recovered and the state was free of any active cases once again.

On 17 May, Victoria announced two further business sites had been shut down due to a suspected case at each. Domino's Pizza in Fairfield has been shut for two weeks, and mattress manufacturer The Comfort Group in Deer Park was closed from Friday 15 May to at least Wednesday 20 May.

On 19 May, in New South Wales, another resident of Newmarch House nursing home died from coronavirus. This brought COVID-19 related deaths at the nursing home to nineteen and the national death toll to 100.

On 21 May, the Northern Territory had also announced that there were no more active cases left in the jurisdiction.

On 25 May, a night duty manager at one of Melbourne's quarantine hotels reported a fever and tested positive on 26 May. Five security guards on contract from Unified Security also tested positive, as did members of their families. Victoria's Chief Health Officer indicated that "a very significant proportion of [Victoria's second wave of] cases were linked to hotel quarantine."

By 26 May, Australia's first human trials of a candidate COVID-19 vaccine, Novavax's NVX-CoV2373, began in Melbourne.

== June 2020 ==
On 6 June, both New South Wales and Victoria reported no new cases for the previous 24 hours, with only Queensland and Western Australia reporting one new case each, the lowest national total since February. Western Australia also announced two old cases. However, the new case in Queensland was linked to the Rydges on Swanston cluster in Melbourne when a man who travelled from Melbourne to Brisbane on Virgin flight VA313 on 1 June tested positive.

On 7 June, a man travelling from overseas to the Australian Capital Territory was diagnosed with coronavirus. This was the Territory's first new COVID-19 case in more than a month, with the last reported case being on 4 May. By 17 June, this case had recovered and there were no longer any more active cases in the Territory once again.

On 12 June, there were no longer any active cases in Tasmania.

On 20 June, the Victorian Government announced the re-tightening of restrictions on household gatherings following a spike in community transmitted cases over the previous week, reported to be mainly caused by family-to-family transmission in large household gatherings. From 22 June, households could again only have five visitors; and most easing of restrictions that were to take place were postponed. The same day restrictions were re-tightened in Victoria, the Western Australian Government announced the state would move into "Phase 4" from 27 June, permitting some of the most relaxed restrictions in the country. The listed restrictions included a reduction of the four-square-metre rule for enclosed venues to two square metres, as well as the allowance of 50% capacity limits for large venues such as Optus Stadium which seats 60,000 patrons at full capacity.

On 30 June, the Victorian Government re-enforced local lockdowns across 10 different Melbourne postcodes. Residents in these postcodes had to comply with the four acceptable reasons to leave their houses: shopping for essentials; for medical or compassionate needs; exercise in compliance with the public gathering restriction of two people; and for work or education purposes.

== July 2020 ==
On 2 July, the Victorian Premier Daniel Andrews announced the "Judicial Inquiry into Hotel Quarantine Program". This followed some cases of coronavirus in Victoria being linked by DNA sequencing to a breach in hotel quarantine infection control. The Inquiry was to "... examine the operation of Victoria's hotel quarantine program for returning travellers." It was headed by retired judge Jennifer Coate, and scheduled to deliver its report to the Governor by 25 September. The inquiry was delayed by lockdown restrictions. Andrews noted that "it is abundantly clear that what has gone on here is completely unacceptable and we need to know exactly what has happened." An interim report was published on 6 November, and the inquiry's final report was published on 21 December. The Government response to the interim report was published in November.

On 4 July, the Victorian Government announced an additional two postcodes affected by the lockdown until 29 July 2020. Furthermore, effective immediately the announcement was made, nine public housing towers housing about 3,000 residents were added, with the additional condition that residents could not leave the tower under any circumstances for five days, with the possibility of extension to 14 days. The Victorian ombudsman later found the lockdown of the public housing towers breached human rights laws, tabling her report in Victoria's Parliament on 17 December 2020.

From 5 July, at the request of the NSW Government, the Federal Government introduced restrictions on the number of passengers arriving at Sydney Airport. A maximum of 50 passengers per flight, and 450 international arrivals per day was set.

On 6 July, the Victorian and NSW governments announced that their interstate border would be closed from the start of 8 July.

On 7 July, after recording 191 new cases, Premier Andrews announced that metropolitan Melbourne and Mitchell Shire would re-enter lockdown for a minimum of six weeks from 12 a.m. on 9 July.

By 10 July more than 357,000 people had returned to Australia since 13 March 2020.

On 11 July, the NSW Government announced that compulsory hotel quarantine, previously free to international arrivals, would now be charged for from 18 July. Those already in quarantine were not charged, nor those who purchased flights and had a confirmed international arrival date before 11:59 p.m. 12 July 2020 AEST.

On 12 July, the free Federally funded childcare introduced on 2 April 2020 ended, and the Federal Child Care Subsidy was reintroduced. At the same time the government loosened the "recognised activities" criteria for those whose employment was impacted by the pandemic. They were eligible for subsidised childcare of up to 100 hours per fortnight till 4 October 2020.

On 14 July, because of an increase in new cases, the NSW Government announced tightened preventive measures, and introduced new requirements for pubs. Effective as of 17 July, the new rules included per-table seating reduced from 20 to 10 and a maximum number of 300 persons in any venue.

On 18 July, it was announced that a sitting of Federal Parliament, scheduled for the first 2 weeks of August, had been cancelled. Medical advice said there was a "significant risk" if members were to return to Canberra from all over Australia. Parliament was rescheduled to return on 24 August.

On 19 July in Victoria, Andrews announced that "face coverings" were to be mandatory in metropolitan Melbourne and Mitchell Shire when residents left their homes. Enforcement began after 11:59 p.m. on Wednesday 22 July to allow time to acquire a face covering. A fine of A$200 applied to those not complying, though there were some exemptions. In addition, the State of Emergency in Victoria was extended until 11:59 p.m. on 16 August 2020. (See 19 July in COVID-19 pandemic in Australia#Victoria for more details.)

On 20 July, the number of daily overseas arrivals allowed at Sydney Airport was reduced from 450 (since 5 July) to 350.

Also on 20 July, it was announced that the Federal Coronavirus Supplement and JobKeeper subsidy would be extended, but in altered form at a lower rate, beyond 24 September.

From 22 July in Victoria visitations to aged care/ health care settings were restricted to carers only and a limit of one hour per day.

On 27 July, the Prime Minister renamed the National COVID-19 Coordination Commission, formed on 25 March 2020 as the "National COVID-19 Commission Advisory Board (NCC)".

In late July, businessman Clive Palmer claimed that the closing of the borders by the Western Australian government was unconstitutional and he launched a legal challenge in the Federal Court. In response the Western Australian Premier Mark McGowan labelled Palmer an enemy of the state. Palmer also claimed that the border closure would "destroy the lives of hundreds of thousands of people for decades" and compared the death toll of COVID-19 with that of road accidents and influenza.

== August 2020 ==
By 1 August, Australia's national death toll exceeded 200.

On 1 August, the 2020 Tasmanian Legislative Council periodic election, deferred from 30 May, took place.

On 2 August, a state of disaster was declared in Victoria from 6 p.m. that day, with the imposition of increased restrictions for at least six weeks; Metropolitan Melbourne moved to stage 4 restrictions and regional Victoria to stage 3 restrictions. The increased restrictions included a curfew across Melbourne from 8 p.m. to 5 a.m. starting immediately, while other changes that took effect from 8 August were that abattoir production was reduced by a third and poultry production by one fifth to allow for reduced worker numbers. Major supermarkets reintroduced limits on meat purchases.

Scott Morrison withdrew support of Clive Palmer's legal challenge to WA border entry restrictions on 2 August after receiving a public backlash against his previously supportive stance. Mark McGowan praised the Commonwealth for its withdrawal and indicated the Western Australian government would continue to fight the case. He urged Palmer to withdraw.

On 7 August, an easing of internal WA restrictions was deferred to at least 29 August due to an outbreak in Victoria.

On 14 August in the Northern Territory, the National NAIDOC Awards and the Awards ceremony, due for November in Mparntwe (Alice Springs) after already being postponed from 11 July, were cancelled due to the "... uncertainty of travel restrictions, quarantining, and physical distancing requirements." Also on 14 August in Tasmania, the 2021 Australian Wooden Boat Festival was cancelled.

The physical Australian Defence Force Academy (ADFA) Open Day in Canberra was replaced by an on-line event from 17 to 22 August.

On 22 August, national COVID-19 deaths exceeded 500, after 17 deaths in Victoria, whose state toll was 415.

== September 2020 ==
On 2 September, the Australian economy goes into recession for the first time in nearly thirty years, as the country's gross domestic product (GDP) falls 7 per cent in the June quarter.

On 3 September 2020, the human biosecurity emergency period in Australia under the Biosecurity Act 2015 (Cth) was extended by the Federal Health Minister until 17 December.

On 6 September, the Victorian Government released their five-step roadmap to reopening, which detailed the conditions which needed to be met to facilitate the gradual easing of Victoria's restrictions.

On 9 September in Canberra, the "Check in CBR" sign-in/contact tracing app was introduced.

On 13 September, Melbourne moved from Stage Four to the First Step of the roadmap for reopening, which allowed for slightly reduced restrictions; such changes included the implementation of social bubbles which allowed those living alone or single parents to have one other person in their home, the reopening of playgrounds and outdoor fitness equipment, libraries allowed to open for contactless click and collect, as well as a reduction of the curfew by an hour. On the same day, regional Victoria moved from Stage Three restrictions to the Second Step of the roadmap, which enabled up to five people to gather together in outdoor public places from a maximum of two households, the reopening of outdoor pools and playgrounds, as well as allowing religious services to be conducted outside with a maximum of five people, plus a faith leader.

On 27 September, with the cases in Melbourne continuing to fall, restrictions there were loosened: the night-time curfew ended the next day, outdoor exercise with a personal trainer was allowed, public gathering limits were increased (up to five people from a maximum of two households could meet outdoors for social interaction) and childcare reopened the next day, with kindergarten programs returning from 5 October. Additionally, primary school students, special school students and students in Years 10–12 undertaking the Victorian Certificate of Education (VCE) or Victorian Certificate of Applied Learning (VCAL) would return to school on 12 October. Victorian Premier Daniel Andrews announced that coronavirus restrictions were intended to be lifted faster, in time for a "Covid-normal Christmas".

In late September a report from Ernst & Young stated that pandemic related border restrictions could result in a shortfall of 26,000 farm workers to pick fruit and vegetables over Australia's summer harvest season. Such work is typically reliant on overseas staff, such as backpackers and seasonal workers from the Pacific Islands. As a trial, some seasonal workers were allowed in, such as 160 workers from Vanuatu allowed into the Northern Territory in early September to pick mangoes. The pickers arrived on a chartered aircraft, and had to undergo the usual 14-day quarantine.

Canberra's 2021 Summernats 34 car festival was "delayed" in late September 2020 until January 2022. The venue, Exhibition Park in Canberra (EPIC) was being used as a COVID-19 testing station. The much smaller, 5,000 patrons maximum, "Summernats Rev Rock ‘n’ Roll" festival was due be held at EPIC on the 5–7 March 2021 Canberra Day long weekend. On 13 January 2021 that event too was cancelled.

== October 2020 ==
The 2020 Federal Budget, due to be delivered in May but delayed because of the coronavirus pandemic, is delivered on 6 October.

On 11 October, Victoria's State of Emergency and State of Disaster were extended until 11.59 pm on 8 November.

On 12 October, Australian scientists at the CSIRO (Commonwealth Scientific and Industrial Research Organisation) were credited with discovering that the coronavirus could survive for up to 28 days on glass, stainless steel and paper banknotes.

On 16 October a trans-Tasman travel bubble went into effect, whereby travellers from New Zealand were able to go to New South Wales, the Australian Capital Territory and the Northern Territory without having to quarantine upon arrival. However, the arrangement was not reciprocal – Australian travellers still had to quarantine for 14 days upon arrival in New Zealand.

On 19 October, restrictions were eased in Victoria; the two-hour time limit for exercise and socialising was lifted, groups of up to 10 people from two households were allowed to gather outdoors, outdoor sports settings like tennis courts, golf courses and skateparks could reopen, outdoor swimming pools can host up to 30 swimmers, hairdressers were able to open with strict safety protocols in place, outdoor real estate auctions were allowed to go ahead with up to 10 people plus staff, non-essential outdoor home maintenance can take place with up to five workers and many allied health services resumed to face-to-face services. Further easing of restrictions were scheduled for 2 November.

On 24 October, Victoria recorded 98 active cases statewide; this was the first time since 19 June in which Victoria had under 100 cases.

On 26 October, the "second wave" ended when Victoria recorded zero new cases and zero deaths statewide for the first time since 9 June 139 days. On the same day, Daniel Andrews announced a significant easing of restrictions to take effect over the coming weeks. From 11.59 pm on 27 October, people no longer required a reason to leave home, all retail, restaurants, hotels, cafes and bars were allowed to open with capacity limits, beauty, personal services and tattooing will reopen, outdoor community sport for under 18 and outdoor non-contact sport for adults recommenced, a maximum of 10 people were allowed to attend weddings, a maximum of 20 mourners allowed to attend funerals and faith and religious gatherings allowed to resume, subject to patron limitations. With a length of 112 days, this Victorian COVID-19 lockdown was the longest continuous lockdown world-wide, as of October 2020. From 11.59 pm on 8 November onwards, the 25 kilometres (16 miles) travel limit was removed, restrictions on moving between regional Victorian and metropolitan Melbourne lifted, gyms and fitness studios opened for with a maximum of 20 people per space and one person per 8 square metres, capacity limits for restaurants, hotels, cafes and bars increased, gathering limits for faith and religious gatherings increased and indoor pools opened for up to 20 people.

On 31 October 2020, Western Australian Premier Mark McGowan announced that from 14 November, Western Australia's hard border policy would be eased, enabling residents from states and territories deemed very low risk (i.e. Tasmania, Queensland, South Australia, the Australian Capital Territory and the Northern Territory) to enter the state without undertaking quarantine.

== November 2020 ==
On 1 November 2020, Australia recorded zero cases of community transmission nationwide for the first time since 9 June 2020.

On 3 November in Melbourne there was an anti-lockdown protest. More than 400 people were arrested and nearly 400 penalties issued.

On 6 November the Victorian hotel quarantine inquiry published its interim report.

On 17 November 2020 the NSW Government announced the "Out and About" economic stimulus voucher scheme. NSW residents over 18 years-of-age will be eligible to receive four A$25 vouchers through Service NSW. Residents will need to have a Service NSW account to receive their vouchers. Two vouchers are for dining, the other two are to be spent on entertainment. After trials in Sydney and regional areas, full rollout was scheduled for March. The scheme was later renamed "Dine & Discover NSW".

On 16 November South Australia reintroduced "a number of significant restrictions" after an outbreak of coronavirus in the northern suburbs of Adelaide.

On 21 November, South Australia ended its lockdown after it was uncovered that the patient thought to have spread the virus hadn't come into contact with many people and had lied to health officials. South Australian Premier Steven Marshall said that the government would be "looking very carefully at what consequences there are going to be", although South Australian Police Commissioner Grant Stevens said that the man would likely not face charges as there was "no penalty associated with telling lies".

On 23 November, the Australian Capital Territory government announced the "ChooseCBR" electronic voucher discount scheme to help stimulate local businesses during the "coronavirus recession". Residents could receive vouchers worth up to A$40 per day.

On 24 November, Victoria recorded no active cases in the state for the first time since 29 February. This was also the first time since 21 February where there were no cases of COVID-19 in Victorian hospitals.

On 27 November, Victoria recorded 28 consecutive days without recording any new COVID-19 infections or deaths; 28 days is considered to be the benchmark for eliminating COVID-19 from the community. Also on 27 November, the 2021 National Multicultural Festival in Canberra was postponed from its usual February dates to "... by late 2021". In early 2021 the Festival was cancelled entirely.

On 30 November, the Victorian government announced that a new dedicated agency, "COVID-19 Quarantine Victoria" (CQV), had been created. The interim Commissioner of CQV is the Commissioner of Corrections, Emma Cassar. CQV is part of the government's response to the COVID-19 Hotel Quarantine Enquirys' interim report. It will oversee all parts of the Victorian quarantine program. The CQV Commissioner will be supported by three Deputy State Controllers, two have been appointed, while as of 15 January 2021 the third Controller position was being advertised.

== December 2020 ==
On 2 December, it was announced Australia had pulled out of recession after experiencing a 3.3% growth in gross domestic product (GDP) in the September quarter. GDP is likely to have experienced a contraction from 2019 figures.

On 11 December, the V451 vaccine being developed at the University of Queensland was abandoned after trials revealed that while safe, it triggered false positives in HIV screening tests.

On 17 December, the Victorian ombudsman Deborah Glass, tabled a report in the Victorian Parliament in which she found the 4 July lockdown of public housing towers in Melbourne breached human rights laws.

On 18 December, Sydney's Northern Beaches was declared a national COVID-19 hotspot following an outbreak that was linked to 28 cases. No patient zero was found for this outbreak. Chief Medical Officer Paul Kelly had designated the region a COVID-19 hotspot in line with the National Cabinet's guidelines, which designates a metropolitan area a potential hotspot if it registers 30 or more community transmissions within three days. In response, Queensland health authorities imposed new border restrictions on anyone entering Queensland who had visited the Northern Beaches cluster area including a mandatory two-week quarantine period.

By 19 December 23 new cases were reported in the Northern Beaches area. On 19 December, Western Australia reinstated its hard border with New South Wales, no longer permitting travel from NSW without an exemption.

By 20 December 30 new cases were reported in Sydney, with 28 being linked to the Avalon RSL club and Avalon bowling club within the Northern Beaches cluster. This brought the total number of cases within the Northern Beaches cluster to 66. In response, Premier Gladys Berejiklian imposed social gathering restrictions across Greater Sydney, the Blue Mountains, and the Central Coast areas including a ten-person limit on private gatherings and restrictions on dancing and singing.

On 20 December, the Northern Territory re-imposed controls on cross border movements of people who were from, or visited Greater Sydney, the Blue Mountains, Illawarra and the Central Coast, including quarantine requirements. Queensland, Victoria, and South Australia also strengthened their borders. Canberra will require quarantine of those from the Central Coast, Greater Sydney, Illawarra-Shoalhaven, and Nepean Blue Mountains.

On 21 December, New South Wales health authorities reported 15 new cases, bringing the total number of cases in Sydney's Northern Beaches cluster to 83. More than 38,000 people had been tested in the previous 24 hours.

Also on 21 December, the Victorian hotel quarantine inquiry published it final report.

On 30 December, a new cluster was announced in New South Wales, comprising six members of an extended family living in Croydon and two other locations, found through testing of a symptomatic family member. No link to the Northern Beaches cluster was immediately identified. The cluster grew by three additional family members on 31 December.

On 30 December, Victoria reported community transmission for the first time in 61 days, with three cases in total found in Melbourne, growing by three further cases on 31 December, suspected to have originated in a traveller from New South Wales. In response, on 31 December, Victoria lowered allowed household guests to 15, and mandated masks indoors anywhere other than in Victorians' own homes.

== See also ==
- Chart of COVID-19 cases in Australia (template)
- COVID-19 clusters in Australia
- COVID-19 pandemic in Australia
- COVID-19 pandemic in Australia (timeline)
- COVID-19 vaccination in Australia
- Chart of COVID-19 cases in Australia (template)
- COVID-19 pandemic by country
- COVID-19 pandemic in Oceania
- Biosecurity in Australia
- National Cabinet of Australia
- National COVID-19 Coordination Commission
- National Security Committee (Australia)
- Coronavirus Australia
- Xenophobia and racism related to the COVID-19 pandemic#Australia
