= Timeline of the COVID-19 pandemic in Australia (July–December 2021) =

Epidemiology of COVID-19 (SARS-CoV-2) virus in Australia

This article documents the chronology and epidemiology of SARS-CoV-2, the virus which causes the coronavirus disease 2019 (COVID-19) and is responsible for the COVID-19 pandemic in Australia during the second half of 2021.

== July 2021 ==
By 1 July in New South Wales (NSW), there were 175 reported infections linked to the Bondi cluster, 188 by 2 July, 207 by 3 July, 222 by 4 July, and 238 by 5 July.

On 2 July, the National Cabinet decided that from 14 July, they would reduce the number of airline passengers allowed into Australia to 3,035, half what it was before. More repatriation flights to the Howard Springs quarantine facility were to be organised in response.

On 5 July, New Zealand Prime Minister Jacinda Ardern confirmed that the travel bubble pause with Australia would be lifted for Western Australia and the Northern Territory from 11:59 pm on 9 July but would remain in place for Queensland and NSW. New Zealanders stranded in Australia who were ordinarily resident in New Zealand would be able to return from 11:59 pm on 9 July provided they met a range of travel requirements.

On 6 July in Victoria, the 2021 Australian Grand Prix, and the 2021 Australian MotoGP at Phillip Island were both cancelled.

On 7 July in NSW, the lockdown in Greater Sydney was extended for 7 days until 12:01am on 17 July. This followed the state having 27 new cases of COVID-19. There were more cases in Canterbury-Bankstown, Fairfield, and Liverpool. Over 45,000 people were tested for COVID "overnight". The same day, the Northern Territory postponed NAIDOC (National Aborigines and Islanders Day Observance Committee) Week, events for which were rescheduled to start on 11 July, though some events were cancelled.

By 9 July in NSW, cases linked to the Bondi cluster had reached 285 and there were 439 active cases in the state. 44 new locally acquired cases were reported on 8 July up to 8pm, 21 were in South Western Sydney, 8 in South-Eastern Sydney and 7 in Western Sydney. Also on 9 July in NSW, from 5pm, social distancing restrictions were again tightened in Greater Sydney, the Blue Mountains, Central Coast, Wollongong and Shellharbour.

On 10 July in NSW, 50 new locally acquired cases were reported, 29 from South Western Sydney and 16 from South Eastern Sydney. NSW Health administered a record of 22,121 COVID-19 vaccines in the past 24 hours.

On 11 July in NSW, the death on 10 July of a woman in her 90s at Liverpool Hospital was reported. It was the first COVID-19 death in Australia since mid-April. The same day in South Australia, a 72-year-old woman with thrombosis with thrombocytopenia syndrome (TTS) died in Royal Adelaide Hospital. She was vaccinated with AstraZeneca on 24 June, then admitted on 5 July. In NSW there were also 77 new locally acquired cases reported, with 52 of them from South Western Sydney Local Health District (LHD), 11 from Sydney LHD and 10 from South Eastern Sydney LHD. Among other rule changes affecting funerals (only 10 may attend), tightened face mask rules were announced, which came into effect on 13 July 2021 in Greater Sydney. From then, a face mask had to be worn in indoor common property areas of rented residential premises.

Also on 11 July, in Victoria the state closed its border from 11:59pm to all New South Wales and Australian Capital Territory residents. This was in an attempt to prevent the delta variant entering the state. 'Border bubble' arrangements for border towns remained in place.

Still on 11 July, the Federal Government launched its "Arm Yourself" vaccination advertising campaign.

On 12 July in NSW, the death of a confirmed COVID-19 case, a man in his 70s from Sydney's Eastern suburbs was reported. This raised the number of deaths in NSW to 58. Also on 12 July in NSW, 112 new locally acquired cases were reported, a total of 678 locally acquired cases since 16 June 2021, the start of the Bondi cluster. 2,703,690 doses of COVID-19 vaccine had been administered in the state. Still on 12 July, the use of QR code check-ins in retail stores, hire vehicles, and many other settings, became mandatory in all NSW.

On 14 July in NSW, the lockdown in Greater Sydney was extended by two weeks to 11:59pm on 30 July. This was after 97 new COVID-19 cases were reported, the majority of them in South West Sydney.

Also on 14 July, in Victoria, after 11 COVID cases were detected there, the state reintroduced the requirement to wear face masks in workplaces, in schools, and when social distancing was not possible, outdoors. Most cases are linked to removalists from NSW. Because of them the Ariele apartments in Maribyrnong was put into a 14-day lockdown on 13 July.

The same day, National Cabinets' 2 July decision to halve the number of airline passengers allowed into Australia to 3,035 came into effect.

On 15 July in Victoria, Premier Daniel Andrews that the state would enter a snap lockdown for 5 days from 11:59pm on 15 July (Thursday) until 11:59pm on 20 July (Tuesday). This will be the third Victorian lockdown in 2021, and the fifth since the start of the pandemic in Australia. There were then 18 cases in the outbreak in Victoria, all of which linked back to "incursions" from NSW.

On 16 July in NSW, one death from COVID-19 was recorded, a man in his 80s from South West Sydney, bringing the total COVID deaths in NSW to 59, nationwide to 913.

On 17 July in NSW one death occurred, a woman in her 90s from South Eastern Sydney. NSW COVID-19 deaths now totaled 60 and nationwide 914 deaths had occurred. By this date, the total number of confirmed cases in NSW reached 6,638. Also on 17 July in NSW, from 11:59pm, movement restrictions in Western Sydney were increased, and impending further business shut-downs and restrictions were announced. From that day most workers living in Canterbury-Bankstown, Fairfield and Liverpool were not permitted to leave those LGAs for work. Carpooling, except with family members was banned in those three LGAs. After the new stay-at-home rules were announced, there was a protest that afternoon at Paul Keating Park in Bankstown against the added lockdown rules for Canterbury-Bankstown, Fairfield and Liverpool. Two people were arrested and charged.

By 18 July in NSW the total number of confirmed cases had reached 6,753.

On 19 July in NSW, the death of a woman in her fifties from COVID-19 was reported at Green Valley in South West Sydney. It was the fifth death in an outbreak of the delta variant of SARS-CoV-2 that began in Bondi during June, and the 61st COVID-19 death in NSW. It brought the national total of COVID-19 deaths to 915.

Also on 19 July in NSW, from 12:01am in Greater Sydney, the Blue Mountains, Central Coast, Shellharbour and Wollongong, many non-essential retail businesses were closed and only allowed to operate as take-away, home delivery, or "click and collect". From the same time building construction work, and in residential premises, cleaning services, repair, and non-urgent maintenance were all "paused". All the new restrictions are scheduled to cease at 11:59pm on 30 July. Also from 19 July in Sydney, all public transport services (train, bus and ferry) will operate on a Sunday timetable for at least 7 days. The NSW government also announced grants through Service NSW of up to A$15,000 for businesses to assist them during the lockdown.

The same day in South Australia, from midnight, "level 4" restrictions were imposed after two close contacts of, and a traveller from overseas, all tested positive. The restrictions included, only outdoor dining allowed, non-essential retail closed, one person per four square metres at indoor venues, private gatherings capped at 10. Masks were required for: high-risk settings, public transport and shared indoor spaces. Events requiring COVID management plans will be cancelled. The restrictions were due to be reviewed on 23 July.

On 20 July, from 6pm, South Australia went into lockdown for 7 days. This was after a 5 case cluster of delta variant linked to Modbury Hospital. Also on 20 July, American Airlines said they would cut out their only Australian route, Los Angeles to Sydney, from 1 September until at least 28 October 2021. It was a response to COVID travel rules which resulted in planes flying with very few passengers.

On 21 July in NSW from 12:01am, stay-at-home orders came into force in the Orange City Council, Blayney Shire Council, and Cabonne Shire Council areas of the Central West of NSW. The orders also applied to anyone who was in those areas on, or after, 17 July. They were scheduled to last until 12:01 am on 28 July, and were lifted as planned.

On 22 July in NSW, there were 124 new locally acquired cases of COVID-19 reported, bringing the total reported since 16 June to 1,648. 54 of the 124 new cases were from South Western Sydney LHD, 8 South Eastern Sydney LHD, 40 Western Sydney LHD, 18 Sydney LHD, 2 Northern Sydney LHD, 1 Illawarra Shoalhaven LHD, and 1 from Nepean Blue Mountains LHD. 7,164 was the total number of confirmed cases. 3,226,932 doses of COVID-19 vaccine had been administered in the state, and 8,220,797 COVID-19 tests done, including a record of 85,185 tests reported in the 24 hours to 8pm on 21 July. The previous day 83,477 test were done.

Also on 22 July, another 2 deaths were linked by the Therapeutic Goods Administration (TGA) to TTS after vaccination with AstraZeneca COVID-19 vaccine. They were a 48-year-old woman from Victoria, and a 44-year-old man from Tasmania who was a confirmed case of TTS. This brought to 6 the number of deaths in Australia linked to rare adverse reactions to vaccines, such as 'thrombosis with thrombocytopenia syndrome' (TTS) and immune thrombocytopenic purpura (ITP).

On 23 July in NSW, the death of an 89-year-old man, the 62nd person to die in the state after contracting COVID-19 and the 916th in Australia, was reported. The same day restrictions on workers leaving the Cumberland and Blacktown LGAs were tightened.

Also on 23 July, at 11:59pm New Zealand suspended its travel bubble with all Australia for at least eight weeks. Travellers from New South Wales, South Australia and Victoria were already unable to travel to NZ due to Delta variant COVID-19 outbreaks in those states.

On 24 July 2021, there were anti-lockdown protests in Brisbane, Melbourne, and in Sydney where several people were arrested, 90 infringement notices issued and 57 people were charged. The protest march in Sydney was unauthorised and breached NSW public health orders.

On 25 July in NSW, there were 2 more COVID-19 related deaths. A woman in her 70s from South West Sydney, and a woman in her 30s from Sydney CBD died. They were the 63rd and 64th to die in NSW, the 7th and 8th since the Bondi outbreak began in June 2021, and the 917th and 918th deaths in Australia since the COVID-19 pandemic began.

On 26 July there were another 2 deaths in NSW. A man in his 80s died in Campbelltown Hospital, and a woman in her 80s died in Pendle Hill. This brought the total number of deaths from COVID-19 in NSW to 66, and the number of deaths in Australia to 920.
The same day, it was announced that, from 2 August (Monday) until 3 September, Parliament House in Canberra would come under COVID-19 restrictions as politicians arrive for the next legislative sitting. All public galleries will close and the general public unable to enter the building. Politicians attending, and their staff, will be "substantially reduced" and remote participation technology used in the houses.

On 27 July in NSW, the 11th death from COVID-19 during the Sydney/NSW outbreak occurred when a 90-year-old woman died at Liverpool Hospital. This was death number 67 in NSW and 921 in Australia from COVID-19 during the pandemic. By that day in NSW there were 172 new locally acquired cases of COVID-19, bringing the total reported since 16 June to 2,397. There were 169 COVID-19 cases in hospital, 46 in intensive care, 19 requiring ventilation. The total number of confirmed cases in NSW reached 7,928.

Also on 27 July, Victoria excluded the LGAs of City of Wagga Wagga, Hay Shire Council, Lockhart Shire Council and Murrumbidgee Council from the cross-border bubble due to a continuing Delta variant outbreak in NSW.

On 28 July in NSW there were 2 more COVID deaths, raising the total number of deaths there to 69. By 28 July in NSW there were 177 new locally acquired cases of COVID-19, bringing the total reported since 16 June to 2,574. There were 165 COVID-19 cases in hospital, 56 in intensive care, 22 requiring ventilation. The total number of confirmed cases in NSW reached 8,105. Also on 28 July, the lockdown in Greater Sydney, and other NSW LGAs (Blue Mountains, Central Coast, Wollongong, Shellharbour) was extended again by four weeks, from 31 July to 28 August. Changes to lockdown rules were also implemented. The same day in NSW stay-at-home orders in the Blayney Shire, Cabonne Shire and Orange City Council areas were lifted as since 20 July there has been no more cases of COVID-19 in those areas.

By 29 July in NSW, there were 239 new locally acquired cases of COVID-19, the highest daily number of new infections since the pandemic began. Restrictions were again tightened that day, mostly in Blacktown, Campbelltown, Canterbury-Bankstown, Cumberland, Fairfield Georges River, Liverpool, and Parramatta (the "8 LGAs of concern"), and NSW Police requested 300 Australian Defence Force assistance to help in compliance and logistics.

On 30 July in NSW, a man in his 60s died in South West Sydney, the 14th death of the Delta outbreak. This increased the number of state deaths to 70, nationwide to 924.

On 31 July in Queensland from 4pm, 11 LGAs in South East Queensland went into a snap lockdown for 3 days. This was after 6 new locally acquired cases of the Delta COVID variant.

== August 2021 ==
On 1 August in NSW, a man aged in his 90s died at Liverpool Hospital. He was the 15th death during the Delta outbreak, the 71st COVID-19 related death in NSW, and the 925th in Australia.

From 2 August in Greater Sydney, all non-urgent elective surgery, was suspended to ensure resources were available for medical response during the ongoing Delta variant outbreak. The Illawarra Shoalhaven and Central Coast Local Health Districts were excluded from the suspension. From 23 August across NSW, 29 private hospitals are also to postpone similar surgeries to free up staff for pandemic response.

On 3 August in NSW, two people died from COVID-19 in Sydney. One was a man in his twenties, the other was a woman in her eighties. This brought COVID deaths in NSW since 16 June 2021 during the Delta outbreak to 17, total NSW COVID deaths to 73 and 927 nationwide, since the start of the pandemic.

On 4 August in NSW, five people died from COVID-19, all confirmed COVID cases. Four of the five dead were male, three in their 60s, one in his 70s, and the last death was a female in her 80s. Deaths in NSW during the Delta outbreak rose to 21, and during the entire COVID-19 pandemic to 78. The total number of deaths nationwide reached 932.

In the preceding 24 hours in NSW there were 233 new locally acquired cases of COVID-19, bringing the total reported since 16 June to 4,063. The total number of confirmed cases in NSW since the beginning of the pandemic reached 9,604. There were 3,426 active COVID-19 cases, 286 in hospital, 53 in intensive care, 23 requiring ventilation in NSW.

On 5 August in NSW, there was one COVID-19 death at Liverpool Hospital. A woman was infected while in the hospital, which had a COVID outbreak. Also on 5 August in NSW, new stay-at-home orders were issued for Cessnock, Dungog, Lake Macquarie, Maitland, Muswellbrook Newcastle, Port Stephens and Singleton from 5pm that day until 12:01am on 13 August. The orders apply to people who have been in these areas on, or after, 31 July.

On 5 August in Victoria, in response to six new cases in the community, the Victorian Government announced their sixth lockdown, commencing that day at 8pm for seven days. On 11 August the lockdown was extended for 7 days, extended again on 16 August for 14 days with a curfew added, then on 21 August regional Victoria joined Melbourne in lockdown.

On 6 August in NSW, another five people died from COVID-19, three in Liverpool Hospital. There were then 84 COVID-related deaths in NSW since the pandemic started in 2020. The total number of deaths in Australia reached 938.

On 7 August in NSW, there was one COVID-19 death, a woman in her 80s died at Royal Prince Alfred Hospital. The total number of COVID related deaths in NSW was now 84, and 28 during the NSW Delta outbreak. Also on 7 August in NSW, the Armidale Regional LGA went into lockdown from 5pm until 12.01am on 15 August.

In the preceding 24 hours in NSW, there were 262 new locally acquired cases of COVID-19, bringing the total reported since 16 June to 5,169. There were 362 COVID-19 cases in hospital, 58 in intensive care, 24 requiring ventilation. Of the days' 58 intensive care cases, 5 were aged in their 20s, 7 in their 30s, 4 in their 40s, 17 in their 50s, 7 in their 60s, 15 in their 70s and 3 in their 80s.

On 8 August in NSW, 12 suburbs in the City of Penrith LGA were identified as areas of concern due to increased community transmission and had extra restrictions applied from 5pm.

On 9 August, in NSW there were four COVID-19 deaths. A man in his 80s died at Liverpool Hospital, the seventh death linked to an outbreak at that hospital. A woman in her 80s also died there, not linked to the outbreak there. A man in his 70s died at Nepean Hospital, and a man in his 80s at Royal Prince Alfred Hospital (RPA), but his infection was overseas acquired. The total number of COVID related deaths reached 940 nationwide, 89 in NSW since the beginning of the pandemic, and 32 in NSW since 16 June during the Delta outbreak.

On 9 August in NSW, the New England town of Tamworth went into lockdown at 5pm for seven days. This follows an unknowingly positive young woman travelling to Tamworth from Newcastle on 5 August and visiting several venues in the town. The same day Ballina Shire, Byron Shire, the City of Lismore, and Richmond Valley Council Local Government Areas on the NSW north coast, also went into lockdown, from 6pm until 12:01 pm on 17 August. This occurred when a man from Sydney tested positive after travelling to the Byron Shire.

On 10 August in NSW, there were two more COVID-19 deaths. A man in his 30s at Northern Beaches Hospital, and man in his 90s at Concord Hospital (Concord Repatriation General Hospital aka CRGH). There were then 91 COVID related deaths in NSW since the beginning of the pandemic, and 34 since 16 June during the Delta outbreak.

On 11 August as of 3pm the official number of COVID deaths nationwide in Australia reached 944. In NSW, there were another two COVID-19 deaths. A man in his 90s at Liverpool Hospital, the sixth death linked to an outbreak there. The other was also a man in his 90s at Royal North Shore Hospital (RNSH). Also in NSW, the town of Dubbo in the central northern Orana Region went into lockdown at 1pm until 12.01am on 19 August. Bogan, Bourke, Brewarrina, Coonamble, Gilgandra, Narromine, Walgett and Warren LGAs, also locked down from 7pm that day, until the beginning of 19 August 2021.

The same day in Victoria, its sixth lockdown was extended for seven days. This followed the state having 20 new cases, 5 with an unknown source.

On 12 August, nationwide there had officially been 947 deaths. In NSW, there were another two COVID-19 deaths. A woman in her 40s died at home, and man in his 90s died at a retirement village in Edgeworth, near Newcastle. The total number of COVID related deaths in NSW was now 95 since the beginning of the pandemic, and 38 since 16 June during the Delta outbreak.
Also on 12 August, the Australian Capital Territory (ACT), including Australia's capital city Canberra, went into lockdown at 5pm, initially for seven days, later extended to 2 September. This followed the first locally acquired case of COVID-19 since 10 July 2020, over a year. In response, NSW ordered that anyone there who was in the ACT since 5 August was under stay-at-home rules.

On 13 August in NSW, NSW Health announced that from 16 August (Monday) non-urgent elective surgery is to be postponed at Dubbo Base Hospital to keep beds available if needed. By 13 August in the ACT, the number of active cases was 6 and there were 1,862 close contacts linked to the first case.

Commonwealth Department Of Health official figures for 13 August showed there had been:

- 948 deaths nationwide
- 38,165 total cases
- 27,578,961 total COVID-19 tests performed nationally
  - 217,816 in previous 24 hours

And there were:

- 6,206 currently active cases (estimated)
- 411 locally acquired infections (previous 24 hours)
- 439 cases hospitalised
  - 67 in intensive care units

On 14 August, all of regional NSW went into lockdown from 5pm, at first until 22 August. This was later extended by 7 days to end on 28 August, then extended again to 10 September after growing cases in western NSW.

By 14 August in NSW, the total number of confirmed COVID-19 cases reached 12,903. Up to 8pm on 13 August, there were 466 new locally acquired cases of COVID-19, bringing the total reported since 16 June to 6,874. Of the new cases, 68 were in the community, not isolated, while infectious, 76 were isolated while infectious, 19 were isolated for part of their infectious period. 1 new case was overseas acquired. 106 of the new cases were from South Western Sydney LHD, 30 South Eastern Sydney LHD, 166 Western Sydney LHD, 37 Sydney LHD, 15 Northern Sydney LHD, 59 Nepean Blue Mountains LHD, 16 Hunter New England LHD, 5 Central Coast LHD, 26 Western NSW LHD, 2 Illawarra Shoalhaven LHD, 4 unknown LHD. 121 cases were linked to a known case or cluster, the source for 345 were under investigation.

On 16 August in NSW, up to 8pm on 15 August, there were 478 locally acquired cases of COVID-19, with the 7 deaths due to COVID-19, the highest reported on a single day within the state.

By 16 August in the ACT, there were 28 active COVID cases, 19 new ones that day. As a consequence the ACT lockdown was extended two weeks until 2 September.

On 16 August in the Northern Territory (NT) the Greater Darwin and Katherine regions went into a snap lockdown due to end at mid-day on 19 August. This followed one new COVID case, a post-quarantine international worker arrival, who was infectious in the community for several days.

On 16 August in Victoria, their lockdown, already extended a week, was extended for another 14 days, with an overnight curfew reinstated and an end date of 2 September.

On 17 August in NSW, there were another 3 deaths of elderly people with COVID-19. The total number of COVID related deaths in NSW since the beginning of the pandemic was now 116, and 60 deaths during the 2 months of the Delta outbreak. Also that day, by 8pm there were 633 new locally acquired cases of COVID-19, bringing the total reported since 16 June to 9,280 and active cases to 7,948. The total number of confirmed cases in NSW since March 2020 reached 14,854. There were 462 cases in hospital, 77 in intensive care, 25 requiring ventilation.

On 18 August, NSW Health announced that from 23 August (Monday), there was to be a " … temporary suspension of non-urgent elective surgery to free up staff to support the pandemic response." at 29 private hospitals across NSW.

The same day, in the Northern Territory the first government assisted repatriation flight, from Denpasar in Bali, landed in Darwin with 200 Australians aboard. Repatriation flights are also due in August from Istanbul, London and New Delhi.

On 19 August in NSW, the end of the lockdown in regional NSW was extended from 22 to 28 August. This followed one more death of a person with COVID-19, and a record 681 new community acquired COVID infections in NSW.

On 20 August NSW Health reported 4 deaths and 644 new locally acquired COVID cases in the prior 24 hours. Among rule changes announced, the lockdown of Greater Sydney was extended a month to the end of September, the Central Coast and Shellharbour, previously part of Greater Sydney for lockdown purposes were re-classified as regional areas, NSW Police received new authority to enforce curfew restrictions. Notice was also given of coming curfew and mandatory outdoor mask requirements.

On 21 August at 1pm, regional Victoria was also placed into lockdown and other restrictions tightened, such as the 5 km limit for essential shopping, and exercise activities. This followed 61 new state cases of COVID-19 on 19 August, one in Shepparton. By the afternoon of 20 August rapid PCR testing brought the cluster in Shepparton to at least 21 cases.

Also on 21 August 2021 there were anti-lockdown protests in Adelaide, Brisbane, Darwin, Melbourne, Perth and Sydney. Up to 4,000 people marched in Melbourne with over 200 arrested. The other protests were much smaller. In Sydney the protest was countered by a pre-planned police response of over 1,500 officers and roadblocks on major roads into the central business district. About 250 protesters got into the city and over 45 people were arrested. One of its main organisers was jailed in NSW the day before the march for breaching public health orders by travelling to Sydney from Queensland.

On 23 August in NSW, as of midnight previously announced added restrictions came into force, a curfew from 9pm to 5am in the 12 NSW 'LGAs of concern', being: Bayside, Blacktown, Burwood, Campbelltown, Canterbury-Bankstown, Cumberland, Fairfield, Georges River, Liverpool, Parramatta, Penrith and Strathfield; and mask wearing made mandatory outside the home everywhere in NSW.

On 25 August in NSW, 3 deaths were reported of COVID cases who died from 17 to 21 August in western Sydney. All men, one was in his 30s, one his 60s, one his 80s. None of them were vaccinated. The total number of COVID related deaths in NSW reached 135 since the beginning of the pandemic, and 79 since the Delta outbreak started.

Also by 25 August, in NSW, there were 1,029 new locally acquired cases, the state's and Australia's record twenty-four hour high. The cumulative state total of confirmed COVID cases reached 21,282; 15,684 of them in the 10 weeks since the first case of the Delta outbreak in Bondi.

On 26 August in regional NSW, the lockdown started on 14 August was extended again to end on 10 September, as COVID cases continued to grow in Western NSW.

In NSW, the 24 hours to 8pm on 27 August brought 2 more deaths, raising the state total to 139, and 83 during the Delta outbreak. There was also another state and national record high of 1,035 new locally acquired cases of COVID-19. There were 778 COVID-19 cases in NSW in hospital, 125 in intensive care and 52 requiring ventilation.

On 28–29 August the official national COVID death toll reached 999 after 6 more deaths in NSW of confirmed cases. One woman and five men, all were aged in their 70s and 80s, and died in hospital. The total number of COVID related deaths in NSW was now 145 since the beginning of the pandemic, and 89 during the NSW Delta outbreak.

Also on 28 August in NSW there were 1,218 new locally acquired cases of COVID-19, a new state record high, bringing the number reported there during the Delta outbreak (since 16 June) to 18,792, and 24,396 total. There were 813 COVID-19 cases in NSW hospitals, 126 in intensive care, 54 requiring ventilation.

- Nationally there had been: 1,294 new cases, 51,256 total confirmed cases-16,852 of them active at this date and 888 hospitalised-140 of them critical.

On 29 August in NSW, there were 4 more deaths of confirmed COVID cases during the 24 hours up to 8pm, a man in his 50s at Dubbo Hospital, a man in his 70s and woman in her 60s at Westmead Hospital, and a man in his 70s at Concord Hospital. The man who died at Dubbo is believed to be the first indigenous Australian (Aboriginal or Torres Strait Islander) COVID-19 related death. He was not vaccinated.
The total number of COVID related deaths in NSW was now 149 since the beginning of the pandemic, and 93 during the NSW Delta outbreak.

On 30 August, the official national death toll rose to 1,002.

By 30 August In NSW, new locally acquired cases of COVID-19 were 1,290, another record high, bringing the total reported since 16 June to 20,061. The total number of confirmed cases in NSW reached 25,668. There were 840 COVID-19 cases in NSW hospitals, 137 in intensive care, 48 requiring ventilation. There were 49,103 COVID-19 vaccinations administered, for 2,516,702 doses total, by NSW Health, plus another 4,277,772 doses administered by the GP network and other providers, for a state total to this date of 6,794,474 vaccinations.

On 30 August in Queensland, there was a COVID protest by truck drivers and supporters on the Gold Coast's M1 highway during the morning peak hour at Reedy Creek where they blocked the highway's exit to the suburb. The protest was against COVID-19 lockdowns and vaccination requirements for drivers. Their supporters included Senator Pauline Hanson. The truckers later moved to Chinderah in NSW to continue their protest.

On 31 August in Victoria, two women with COVID-19 died in their own homes, one aged in her 40s, the other in her 60s. They were the state's first COVID-19 related deaths for nine months, the previous being on 30 November 2020. The same day there were 76 new locally acquired cases in Victoria, 45 linked to existing outbreaks and 36 in isolation while they were infectious.

Also on 31 August, in NSW there were at least 79 anti-lockdown protests across the state, including outside the NSW Parliament building and other government buildings in suburban and regional centres. Police arrested over 150 people and issued more than 500 infringement notices. Several police officers were injured.

== September 2021 ==
On 1 September Australia Post (AusPost) announced that, partly due to having 500 staff per day in COVID-19 self-isolation, parcel pick-ups from online retailers in locked down states, the ACT, NSW and Victoria, was to be stopped for four days, from 7am on 4 September. Due to lockdowns across Australia, during August AusPost processed a record amount of mail, even exceeding the number of parcels delivered during Christmas 2020, creating stress on the delivery system. Flight restrictions and closure of postal facilities that had cases of COVID-19 were also putting pressure on the parcel network. All other services, such as post offices, continued to operate.

Also on 1 September the NSW government announced it would cut its international arrivals into the state by 50% until late October.

On 2 September there were 11 COVID-19 deaths in NSW in the preceding 24 hours, plus 1 in Victoria. The total number of COVID related deaths in NSW was now 175 since the beginning of the pandemic, 119 during the NSW Delta outbreak. In Victoria it was 823 total deaths. Nationally deaths reached 1,032.

By 2 September in NSW, COVID-19 vaccinations administered reached a state total of 7,101,918 vaccinations.

On 3 September in NSW, new locally acquired cases of COVID-19 in the preceding 24 hours were 1,533 up to 8pm, a record high at that date, and brought total new cases reported since 16 June to 26,517. The total number of confirmed cases in NSW reached 32,134. Nationally deaths reached 1,036.

On 5 September, over 160,000 doses of Pfizer vaccine from the United Kingdom (UK) arrived in Sydney. It was the first shipment as part of a vaccine swap deal. The deal would double Australia's supply of Pfizer vaccine doses for September, and close a gap in supply.

By 7 September, there had been 3 deaths of indigenous Australians, all in NSW, none of whom were vaccinated.

By 9 September in NSW, state deaths reached 204, with the death of 9 people in the preceding 24 hours. 148 of the deaths were since 16 June 2021 during the Delta outbreak. Nationally deaths reached 1,061.

On 10 September in NSW, new locally acquired cases of COVID-19 were 1,599. It was a state and national record high at the time, but was exceeded in Victoria with 1,763 new cases on 4 October. In NSW confirmed cases reported during their Delta outbreak were over 36,000. The total of all confirmed cases in NSW reached 42,000. Nationally, cumulative total cases were almost 72,000, and after 8 more deaths in NSW, COVID-19 deaths nationwide reached 1,084.

On 11 September in NSW, at 12:01am many, but not all, areas of regional NSW came out of lockdown. Those that did, had no cases of COVID for 14 days, and were also deemed low-risk. The regional lockdown started on 14 August.

Also on 11 September, the ACT became the first Australian state or territory to have 50% of their eligible population over 16-years-old fully vaccinated.

On 14 September in NSW, Yass Valley Council LGA was placed back into lockdown, 3 days after the regional lockdown lifted there, for another 2 weeks. It applied to anyone who was in the LGA on, or after, 9 September. This followed a local case of COVID-19 and sewage detection of the virus.

On 16 September Tasmania became the second state, after the Australian Capital Territory, to get 50% of its eligible population over 16-years-old fully vaccinated.

Also on 16 September in NSW, the regional LGAs of City of Albury, and City of Lismore were both placed back into lockdown from 6pm, for 7 days. This was less than 6 days after the regional NSW lockdown lifted on 11 September. It applies to anyone who was in Albury since 10 September, and Lismore since 7 September.

On 17 September in NSW, the Hilltops Council and Glen Innes Severn LGAs were also placed back into lockdown from 6pm for 7 days. The stay-at-home orders applied to residents, or visitors to Hilltops, including Young and adjoining areas since 3 September, and Glen Innes, since 13 September.

By 17 September in NSW, 50% of the state's over 16-year-old population had been fully vaccinated, and confirmed cases of COVID-19 exceeded 50,000.

On 18 September in NSW, there were 13 deaths of confirmed cases, the state's highest COVID-19 death toll in a 24-hour period. 9 of the 12 were not vaccinated, 2 were partly vaccinated, 2 were fully vaccinated. The total number of COVID related deaths in NSW was now 297 since the beginning of the pandemic, 241 during the NSW Delta outbreak.
National deaths rose to 1,162.

On 19 September in NSW, 4 more deaths brought to 301 the state's number of COVID-19 deaths, a figure reached by Victoria in mid-August 2020. New locally acquired cases, also reported on 19 September, were under 1,000 for the first time since 27 September, falling to 935. The NSW record daily high was 1,599 new cases on 10 September.

Also on 19 September, in Victoria, at 11:59pm the City of Greater Geelong, Surf Coast Shire and the Shire of Mitchell local government areas went back into lockdown for at least 7 days.

On 20 September in Victoria, there was a COVID-19 vaccination protest that became violent. Hundreds of people against mandatory vaccination for construction workers gathered outside the Construction, Forestry, Maritime, Mining and Energy Union (CFMEU) headquarters in Melbourne. The building was damaged and riot police involved. Combined with an increase in transmission of COVID-19 in the industry, from 11.59pm that night all construction worksites in Ballarat, Geelong, Metropolitan Melbourne, Mitchell Shire and the Surf Coast were shut for 2 weeks.

On 20 September in NSW, the Cowra Shire LGA was placed back into lockdown for 7 days with stay-at-home orders enacted and applied to anyone in that shire since 13 September. On 27 September the lockdown was extended by 7 days.

On 21 September in NSW, at 5pm the Kempsey Shire, Byron Shire and Tweed Shire LGAs in the state's north were placed back into lockdown for 7 days with stay-at-home orders re-implemented. The orders applied to residents, or visitors to, the Kempsey LGA since 14 September, and Byron or Tweed LGAs since 18 September.

Also on 21 September in Victoria, there was a large protest in Melbourne against a wide range of pandemic response related issues, including the previous days' construction industry shut down. The "Victorian Workers Rally For Freedom" eventually blocked the busy West Gate Freeway disrupting peak hour traffic. A news reporter was assaulted and objects thrown at police. Riot officers were on duty and at least 60 arrests were made. Union officials said that the protests had been hijacked by "… far right groups and anti-vax groups, …".

On 22 September in Victoria, there again a building industry shutdown related protest in Melbourne, the third day of protests in a row.

On 23 September in NSW, the lockdown in Hilltops LGA was extended by 7 days, according to the state Health Ministry (NSW Health), "… due to ongoing transmission in the area".

On 23 September in Victoria, there was a strong police presence in Melbourne at State Parliament, CFMEU offices, and the Shrine of Remembrance. 92 arrests were made as police checked that people were lawfully in the CBD and in compliance with the state Chief Health Officers' current directives. Some arrests were for outstanding warrants. The protests resulted in the temporary closure of a vaccination centre at Melbourne Town Hall, and also a drop-in clinic for the homeless near Queen Victoria Market. Staff at the vaccination clinic were verbally and physically abused in public places on their way to work.

On 24 September in Victoria, there was again a strong presence of police in Melbourne. More than 200 were arrested across the city as police acted to prevent protesters gathering.

On 26 September in the ACT, there was 1 death, the first in the Territory since mid-April 2020. The man was fully vaccinated, but in his 90s, and undergoing end-of-life treatment. The total number of COVID deaths in the ACT increased to 4.

On 26 September in NSW, the 60% level of full (double dose) COVID-19 vaccination of eligible residents was reached. 85% had had a single vaccine dose.

On 27 September in NSW, Cowra was due to come out of a 7-day lockdown at midnight, but "due to the risk of ongoing COVID-19 transmission" it was extended to 12:01am on 5 October.

On 28 September in NSW, there were 15 deaths of confirmed COVID cases to 8pm, the state's highest COVID-19 death toll in a 24-hour period. The total number of COVID related deaths in NSW was now 387 since the beginning of the pandemic, 331 during the NSW Delta outbreak.
National deaths rose to 1,278.

Also on 28 September in NSW, at 6pm the Port Macquarie-Hastings and Muswellbrook Shire LGAs were both placed back into lockdown for 7 days.

On 29 September in NSW, Oberon Council LGA went into lockdown at 6pm for 7 days. The stay-at-home order applies to residents and visitors to Oberon since 20 September.

Also on 29 September in NSW, the total number of COVID-19 vaccine doses administered exceeded 10 million at 10,101,970 doses.

On 30 September in NSW at least 65% of the state's over-16 population had been fully vaccinated, and over 87% had received one dose.

== October 2021 ==
On 1 October in NSW, 15 deaths and 864 new locally acquired cases of COVID-19 were recorded within the previous 24 hours. The total number of COVID related deaths in NSW since the beginning of the pandemic was now 408.

On 2 October in NSW, 10 deaths and 813 new locally acquired cases of COVID-19 were recorded within the previous 24 hours. The total number of COVID cases in NSW since the beginning of the pandemic was now 63,825.

On 3 October in NSW, 10 deaths and 667 new locally acquired cases of COVID-19 were recorded within the previous 24 hours. The total number of COVID related deaths was 428, and there were 64,479 COVID cases in NSW since the beginning of the pandemic.

On 4 October in NSW, 6 deaths and 623 new locally acquired cases of COVID-19 were recorded within the previous 24 hours. The total number of COVID related deaths was 434, and COVID cases in NSW since the beginning of the pandemic reached 65,090. City of Lismore LGA went into lockdown until 11 October. The stay-at-home order applies to residents and visitors to the City of Lismore LGA since 28 September.

Also on 4 October, Victoria set a new Australian record of 1,763 new daily cases, breaking the record of 1,599 new cases set in NSW on 10 September.

On 5 October in NSW, 7 deaths and 608 new locally acquired cases of COVID-19 were recorded within the previous 24 hours. The total number of COVID related deaths was 441, and there were 65,687 COVID cases in NSW since the beginning of the pandemic.

Also on 5 October, 80% of Australia's eligible population (aged 16 and older) had received at least one dose of COVID-19 vaccine. About 57% were fully vaccinated.

On 6 October in NSW, 10 deaths and 594 new locally acquired cases of COVID-19 were recorded within the previous 24 hours. The total number of COVID related deaths was 451, and there were 66,267 COVID cases in NSW since the beginning of the pandemic.

On 7 October in NSW, 8 deaths and 587 new locally acquired cases of COVID-19 were recorded within the previous 24 hours. The total number of COVID related deaths was 459, and there were 66,835 COVID cases in NSW since the beginning of the pandemic.

Also on 7 October, the NSW government began easing a number of restrictions, as over 70% double vaccination rate for the eligible population had been reached. Multiple social venues had loosened restrictions, along with the return to face-to-face learning for school students with the earliest return date of 18 October.

On 8 October in NSW, 11 deaths and 646 new locally acquired cases of COVID-19 were recorded within the previous 24 hours. The total number of COVID related deaths was 470, and there were 67,480 COVID cases in NSW since the beginning of the pandemic.

On 8 October Victoria reported 1,838 new cases, a new state and national record high, surpassing the state's own 1,763 new case record set on 4 October.

On 9 October in NSW, 11 deaths and 580 new locally acquired cases of COVID-19 were recorded within the previous 24 hours. The total number of COVID related deaths was 481, and there were 68,057 COVID cases in NSW since the beginning of the pandemic.

On 10 October in NSW, 6 deaths and 477 new locally acquired cases of COVID-19 were recorded within the previous 24 hours. The total number of COVID related deaths was 487, and there were 68,523 COVID cases in NSW since the beginning of the pandemic.

Also on 10 October, over 90% of the over-16 population in NSW had received a first dose COVID-19 vaccine.

On 11 October in NSW, 8 deaths and 496 new locally acquired cases of COVID-19 were recorded within the previous 24 hours. The total number of COVID related deaths was 495, and there were 69,016 COVID cases in NSW since the beginning of the pandemic. The same day, which some news media dubbed "Freedom Day", the 107 day lockdown in NSW was eased, especially for the fully vaccinated. Stay-at-home orders were removed; non-essential retailers, hairdressers, and hospitality venues were among those able to re-open; masks were no longer mandatory in the open, though still required indoors in public places.

By 12 October NSW official deaths reached exactly 500, a level passed by 29 August 2020 in Victoria with 18 deaths taking their total toll to 513 deaths.

On 13 October, NSW exceeded 70,000 confirmed cases of COVID-19 since the beginning of the pandemic.

On 14 October Victoria reported 2,297 new local cases, another state and national record high, surpassing the 1,838 record cases reported by Victoria on 8 October 2021. This national record was again broken on 17 December by NSW with 2,482 cases.

On 15 October, national deaths passed 1,500.

On 15 October Tasmania's southern region, including the City of Hobart and 11 other LGAs, went into a 3-day lockdown at 6pm. A man with the Delta variant of COVID-19 escaped from hotel quarantine on 12 October and was about in the community before police located him the next day. As a result of the lockdown, The Unconformity arts festival due to start that day in Queenstown was cancelled.

On 16 October, NSW reached 80% full vaccination.

On 26 October, in the Jervis Bay Territory, 4 cases of COVID-19 were confirmed.

== November 2021 ==
On 15 November In Victoria, an inquest began into 50 deaths, 45 from COVID-19, that occurred in July and August 2020 at St Basil's Homes for the Aged, Fawkner, Melbourne. It was the deadliest COVID-19 outbreak in an aged care setting in Australia.

On 27 November, in response to the discovery of the Omicron variant in South Africa and neighbouring countries, Australia introduced new travel restrictions. Non-Australian citizens who have been in nine countries, being Botswana, Eswatini, Namibia, Lesotho, Malawi, Mozambique, Seychelles, South Africa and Zimbabwe, where Omicron has been detected cannot enter Australia. Those people who have been in those countries over the previous 14 days will have to enter two weeks' supervised quarantine. Recent arrivals from those countries must isolate for 14 days.

On 28 November, two cases of the Omicron variant were detected in Sydney. Both people landed in Sydney the previous day, and travelled from southern Africa to Sydney via Doha, Qatar. The two people, who were fully vaccinated, entered isolation; 12 other travellers from southern Africa also entered quarantine for fourteen days, while about 260 other passengers and crew on the flight were directed to isolate. On 29 November, another positive case of the Omicron variant was recorded at the Howard Springs Quarantine Facility, in a returned traveller who arrived at Darwin from Johannesburg, South Africa on 25 November.

On 30 November, the official national COVID-19 death toll exceeded 2,000, having approximately doubled since 31 August 2021.

== December 2021 ==
On 3 December, the Northern Territory (NT) recorded its first COVID-19 death, a 78-year-old woman from the community of Binjari. NT was, till then, the last Australian state without a COVID death.

On 5 December 2021 the TGA provisionally approved the Pfizer vaccine for 5 to 11-year-olds.

As of 10 December 2021, it was planned to start vaccinating children aged 5 to 11 with the Pfizer vaccine from 10 January 2022.

On 16 December in NSW, NSW Health suggested the Newcastle community consider deferring social events till after Christmas. That afternoon the Lunar Electric Music Festival in Newcastle, scheduled for 18 December, was cancelled by a Public Health Order. This was done because the ongoing spread of the Omicron variant of COVID-19 in that area was deemed too high a risk.

On 18 December in Queensland, from 1:00am masks again became mandatory across the entire state in many public and outdoor places.

On 20 December, confirmed cases of COVID-19 in Australia exceeded 250,000.

On 21 December in NSW, 2 people died of COVID, raising the NSW Health official death toll to 649. Daily new cases in NSW were a record high of 3,763.

From 21 December in Tasmania, masks were again required in "non-domestic indoor settings".

On 22 December in the ACT, masks were also again made mandatory indoors, after that requirement was mostly dropped there on 12 November. Caps on aged care facility visitors also returned. This was done in order to slow the Omicron variants' spread. In the previous seven days the ACT recorded 103 new COVID-19 cases, but only 37 in the seven days before that. 62 cases were confirmed as Omicron.

On 24 December in NSW, the state's new daily cases of COVID-19 rose to 6,288, a new record high, up from 3,763 on 21 December. The same day in NSW, mask wearing indoors again became mandatory.

On 24 December, Victoria also reintroduced mandatory wearing of masks. Except in private homes, masks must be worn indoors. Major events also require patrons to be masked while moving around, but not if seated outdoors.

On 26 December in NSW, the first death in Australia related to the Omicron variant occurred. The man in his 80s from western Sydney, died at Westmead Hospital. He had 2 doses of vaccine, and underlying health conditions.

From 27 December, South Australia re-tightened social distancing restrictions.

On 28 December in NSW, new case numbers jumped by about 85% in 24 hours to 11,201, a new national record, from 6,062 on 27 December.

On 30 December in NSW, new cases that day jumped sharply by over 70% to 21,151 from 12,226 on 29 December, setting another national record.

Nationally, active cases were approximately 110,424.

On 30 December in SA, the death of a COVID positive 13-month-old was reported, the sixth person with COVID to die in SA.

Also on 30 December, on Norfolk Island, COVID-19 was found for the first time. 2 cases were detected.

On 31 December in NSW, new daily COVID cases reached a national record of 22,577. The large number of new cases also pushed the state's cumulative total of cases to nearly 210,000.

The same day, the official national total of COVID-19 cases reported in Australia reached 395,504.

== See also ==
- Chart of COVID-19 cases in Australia (template)
- COVID-19 clusters in Australia
- COVID-19 pandemic in Australia
- COVID-19 pandemic in Australia (timeline)
- COVID-19 vaccination in Australia
- Chart of COVID-19 cases in Australia (template)
- COVID-19 pandemic by country
- COVID-19 pandemic in Oceania
- Biosecurity in Australia
- National Cabinet of Australia
- National COVID-19 Coordination Commission
- National Security Committee (Australia)
- Coronavirus Australia
- Xenophobia and racism related to the COVID-19 pandemic#Australia
