= 2012 Emmy Awards =

2012 Emmy Awards may refer to:

- 64th Primetime Emmy Awards, the 2012 Emmy Awards ceremony that honored primetime programming during June 2011 – May 2012
- 39th Daytime Emmy Awards, the 2012 Emmy Awards ceremony that honored daytime programming during 2011
- 33rd Sports Emmy Awards, the 2012 Emmy Awards ceremony that honored sports programming during 2011
- 40th International Emmy Awards, honoring international programming

Preceded by 2011	Emmy Awards; 2012	Succeeded by 2013
