= Timeline of the COVID-19 pandemic in Australia =

Timeline of the COVID-19 pandemic in Australia may refer to:

- Timeline of the COVID-19 pandemic in Australia (2020)
- Timeline of the COVID-19 pandemic in Australia (January–June 2021)
- Timeline of the COVID-19 pandemic in Australia (July–December 2021)
- Timeline of the COVID-19 pandemic in Australia (2022)
