= Timeline of the COVID-19 pandemic in Australia (2022) =

COVID-19 pandemic in Australia

This article documents the chronology and epidemiology of SARS-CoV-2, the virus which causes the coronavirus disease 2019 (COVID-19) and is responsible for the COVID-19 pandemic in Australia during 2022.

== January ==
On 1 January 2022 to 3pm, a total of 430,712 cases of COVID-19 were reported in Australia, 2,253 deaths, and there were approximately 158,782 active cases.
55,233,500 tests had been done during the pandemic, 0.8% were positive.

On 3 January to 3pm, a total of 499,958 cases of COVID-19 were reported in Australia, 2,266 deaths, and there were approximately 218,505 active cases.
55,634,500 tests had been done, 0.9% were positive.

Also on 3 January, in New South Wales (NSW), daily new COVID-19 case figures rose over 50%, from 23,131 the day before to 35,054. It was the highest number so far for any Australian state or territory.

On 4 January to 3pm, a total of 547,653 cases of COVID-19 were reported in Australia, 2,271 deaths, and there were approximately 254,232 active cases.
55,842,000 tests had been done, 1% were positive.

In early January in New South Wales (NSW) shortages of some foods on supermarket shelves, such as fresh fruit, meat and vegetables, occurred as the effects of the pandemic on supply chains, such as staff shortages caused by transport and distribution centre workers having to isolate after COVID exposure, took hold. The problem is worse because of the extra demand during the Christmas/New Year holiday period coinciding with large increases in COVID-19 infections.

By 4 January, the Australian Competition & Consumer Commission (ACCC) was investigating allegations of excessive pricing of COVID-19 rapid antigen tests (RAT).

On 5 January to 3pm, a total of 612,106 cases of COVID-19 were reported in Australia, 2,289 deaths, and there were approximately 287,637 active cases.
56,078,000 tests had been done, 1.1% were positive.

Also on 5 January, Coles Supermarkets introduced limits on some food items. Except in Western Australia (WA), chicken breasts, chicken thighs, mince and sausages were limited to 2 packs.

Still on 5 January, National Cabinet decided to provide concession card holders with up to 10 free RAT test kits, over a three-month period.
Other decisions were:
• a polymerase chain reaction (PCR) test would not be required anymore for anyone who had a positive RAT test result
• regular testing for truck drivers was to be ceased
• arrivals from overseas not required to take multiple tests

On 6 January to 3pm, a total of 684,227 cases of COVID-19 were reported in Australia, 2,301 deaths, and there were approximately 330,289 active cases.
56,326,500 tests had been done, 1.2% were positive.

On 7 January, a total of 761,926 cases of COVID-19 were reported in Australia, 2,319 deaths, and there were approximately 381,269 active cases. Over the past 7 days, new cases averaged 52,364 per day.
56,585,000 tests had been done, 1.3% were positive.

On 8 January, a total of 849,833 cases of COVID-19 were reported in Australia, 2,345 deaths, and there were approximately 441,429 active cases. Over the past 7 days, new cases averaged 59,896 per day.
Over 56,861,000 tests had been done, 1.5% were positive.

Also on 8 January, the Australian Government prohibited price gouging of COVID-19 RAT test kits, and their improper export, under the Biosecurity Act 2015. Penalties are up to 5 years jail, and/or fines over $66 thousand. The controls took effect from 1:00am on 8 January, until 17 February 2022.

On 9 January, a total of 922,892 cases of COVID-19 were reported in Australia, 2,367 deaths, and there were approximately 495,141 active cases. Over the past 7 days, new cases averaged 65,740 per day.
Over 57,116,500 tests had been done, 1.6% were positive.

On 10 January, a total of 973,470 cases of COVID-19 were reported in Australia, 2,389 deaths, and there were approximately 587,971 active cases. Over the past 7 days, new cases averaged 67,663 per day.
Over 57,343,500 tests had been done, 1.7% were positive.

Also on 10 January, NSW exceeded 500,000 total cases of COVID-19 since March 2020.

On 11 January, a total of 1,042,293 cases of COVID-19 were reported in Australia, 2,416 deaths, and there were approximately 612,619 active cases. Over the past 7 days, new cases averaged 70,708 per day.
Over 57,561,000 tests had been done, 1.8% were positive.

On 12 January, a total of 1,124,138 cases of COVID-19 were reported in Australia. After 21 deaths reported that day in Victoria, 22 in NSW, and 6 in Qld, official national deaths rose to 2,465. There were approximately 696,699 active cases. Over the past 7 days, new cases averaged 73,181 per day.
Over 57,850,000 tests had been done, 1.9% were positive.

By at least 12 January, difficulties in consumers finding COVID-19 RAT tests, that were apparent in NSW in before Christmas in December 2021, had spread nationally.

On 13 January, a total of 1,195,158 cases of COVID-19 were reported in Australia. After 18 deaths were reported in Victoria, 29 in NSW, and 3 in Qld, official national deaths rose to 2,522. There were approximately 734,211 active cases. Over the past 7 days, new cases averaged 73,042 per day.
Over 58,069,500 tests had been done, 2.1% were positive.

Also on 13 January, Woolworths introduced national buying limits of 2 packs to toilet paper and pain medication in response to supply chain problems. Limits on some meat products were applied, only in Western Australia, to chicken, mince and sausages, limiting them to 2 packs per customer after "excessive buying.

On 14 January, a total of 1,261,793 cases of COVID-19 were reported in Australia. Official national deaths rose to 2,578. Active cases peaked at approximately 765,680. Over the past 7 days, new cases averaged 71,441 per day.
Over 58,321,500 tests had been done, 2.2% were positive.

On 15 January, a total of 1,321,985 cases of COVID-19 were reported in Australia. Official national deaths rose to 2,633. There were approximately 666,157 active cases. Over the past 7 days, new cases averaged 67,332 per day.
Over 58,533,000 tests had been done, 2.3% were positive.

Also on 15 January, the Northern Territory reported their second COVID related death, at Royal Darwin Hospital. The 40-year-old women was fully vaccinated but no booster, and had underlying health conditions.

On 16 January, a total of 1,378,449 cases of COVID-19 were reported in Australia. Official national deaths rose to 2,668. There were approximately 712,046 active cases. Over the past 7 days, new cases averaged 64,923 per day.
Over 58,782,000 tests had been done, 2.3% were positive.

On 17 January, a total of 1,425,501 cases of COVID-19 were reported in Australia. Official national deaths rose to 2,698. There were approximately 708,180 active cases. Over the past 7 days, new cases averaged 64,291 per day.
Over 58,984,000 tests had been done, 2.4% were positive.

=== Highest deaths ===
On 18 January, 77 COVID-19 deaths were reported in Australia, the highest number so far, though not all occurred on the same day (17 January). New South Wales reported 36 deaths, Victoria 22, Queensland 16, South Australia 2, and the Australian Capital Territory, 1 death.

On 19 January, to encourage tourists and particularly potential workers to come to Australia, the Federal Government offered to repay visa fees to backpackers on working holiday-maker visas and to international students who come to Australia in the following months. At this date there were about 23,000 backpackers and 150,000 students who had a visa but were not in Australia.

On 20 January, NSW had a daily record for that state of 46 deaths reported, though 7 were from 29 December 2021 – 13 January 2022. It also took the state to 1,024 deaths. The same day, Tasmania had its first death since April 2020.

On 22 January, Australia exceeded 3,000 deaths related to COVID-19 since the beginning of the pandemic.

On 31 January in Victoria, the states' total of COVID-19 related deaths since March 2020 passed 2,000.

== February ==
By 4 February, Australia exceeded 4,000 deaths.

On 4 February, there were 21 COVID deaths in Qld, the states' highest to date in any reporting period. It raised total Qld deaths to 268.

On 5 February, in Qld the Wellcamp COVID quarantine facility, officially the Queensland Regional Accommodation Centre, was to receive its first guests, unvaccinated travelers from New Zealand.

By 12 February, Australia exceeded 4,500 deaths. The same day, 98 COVID-19 deaths were reported in Australia, the highest number in a 24-hour period to that date, exceeding the high of 88 on 18 January. 39 were in Victoria, 35 in NSW, 18 in Queensland, 5 in South Australia and 1 in the ACT.

By 23 February, Australia exceeded 5,000 deaths, doubling since 13 January.

== March ==
By 7 March, over 3 million COVID-19 cases had been officially reported.

By 11 March, more than 5,500 Australians had died from COVID-19.

By 16 March, in NSW, state COVID deaths reached 2,001.

== April ==
On 1 April, Australians who had died from COVID-19 exceeded 6,000.

On 6 April the NSW death toll reached 2,505.

== May ==
On 3 May, the national death toll reached 7,270.

== See also ==
- COVID-19 clusters in Australia
- COVID-19 pandemic in Australia
- COVID-19 pandemic in Australia (timeline)
- COVID-19 vaccination in Australia
- Chart of COVID-19 cases in Australia (template)
- COVID-19 pandemic by country
- COVID-19 pandemic in Oceania
- Biosecurity in Australia
- National Cabinet of Australia
- National COVID-19 Coordination Commission
- National Security Committee (Australia)
- Coronavirus Australia
- Xenophobia and racism related to the COVID-19 pandemic#Australia
