= 2013 Emmy Awards =

2013 Emmy Awards may refer to:

- 65th Primetime Emmy Awards, the 2013 Emmy Awards ceremony that honored primetime programming during June 2012 – May 2013
- 40th Daytime Emmy Awards, the 2013 Emmy Awards ceremony that honored daytime programming during 2012
- 34th Sports Emmy Awards, the 2013 Emmy Awards ceremony that honored sports programming during 2012
- 41st International Emmy Awards, honoring international programming

Preceded by 2012	Emmy Awards; 2013	Succeeded by 2014
