= 2010 Emmy Awards =

2010 Emmy Awards may refer to:

- 62nd Primetime Emmy Awards, the 2010 Emmy Awards ceremony honoring primetime programming during June 2009 – May 2010
- 37th Daytime Emmy Awards, the 2010 Emmy Awards ceremony honoring daytime programming during 2009
- 31st Sports Emmy Awards, the 2010 Emmy Awards ceremony that honored sports programming during 2009
- 38th International Emmy Awards, honoring international programming

Preceded by 2009	Emmy Awards; 2010	Succeeded by 2011
