= 2009 Emmy Awards =

2009 Emmy Awards may refer to:

- 61st Primetime Emmy Awards, the 2009 Emmy Awards ceremony that honored primetime programming during June 2008 – May 2009
- 36th Daytime Emmy Awards, the 2009 Emmy Awards ceremony that honored daytime programming during 2008
- 30th Sports Emmy Awards, the 2009 Emmy Awards ceremony that honored sports programming during 2008
- 37th International Emmy Awards, honoring international programming

Preceded by 2008	Emmy Awards; 2009	Succeeded by 2010
