= 2014 Emmy Awards =

2014 Emmy Awards may refer to:

- 66th Primetime Emmy Awards, the 2014 Emmy Awards ceremony that honored primetime programming during June 2013 – May 2014
- 41st Daytime Emmy Awards, the 2014 Emmy Awards ceremony that honored daytime programming during 2013
- 35th Sports Emmy Awards, the 2014 Emmy Awards ceremony that honored sports programming during 2013
- 42nd International Emmy Awards, the 2014 ceremony that honored international programming

Preceded by 2013	Emmy Awards; 2014	Succeeded by 2015
