= 2015 Emmy Awards =

2015 Emmy Awards may refer to:

- 67th Primetime Emmy Awards, the 2015 Emmy Awards ceremony that honored primetime programming during June 2014 – May 2015
- 42nd Daytime Emmy Awards, the 2015 Emmy Awards ceremony that honored daytime programming during 2014
- 36th Sports Emmy Awards, the 2015 Emmy Awards ceremony that honored sports programming during 2014
- 43rd International Emmy Awards, the 2015 ceremony that honored international programming

Preceded by 2014	Emmy Awards; 2015	Succeeded by 2016
