= 2011 Emmy Awards =

2011 Emmy Awards may refer to:

- 63rd Primetime Emmy Awards, the 2011 Emmy Awards ceremony that honored primetime programming during June 2010 – May 2011
- 38th Daytime Emmy Awards, the 2011 Emmy Awards ceremony that honored daytime programming during 2010
- 32nd Sports Emmy Awards, the 2011 Emmy Awards ceremony that honored sports programming during 2010
- 39th International Emmy Awards, honoring international programming

Preceded by 2010	Emmy Awards; 2011	Succeeded by 2012
