= 2008 Emmy Awards =

2008 Emmy Awards may refer to:

- 60th Primetime Emmy Awards, the 2008 Emmy Awards ceremony honoring primetime programming during June 2007 – May 2008
- 35th Daytime Emmy Awards, the 2008 Emmy Awards ceremony honoring daytime programming during 2007
- 29th Sports Emmy Awards, the 2008 Emmy Awards ceremony honoring sports programming during 2007
- 36th International Emmy Awards, honoring international programming

Preceded by 2007	Emmy Awards; 2008	Succeeded by 2009
