= Liverpool Hospital =

- South Western Sydney Local Health District
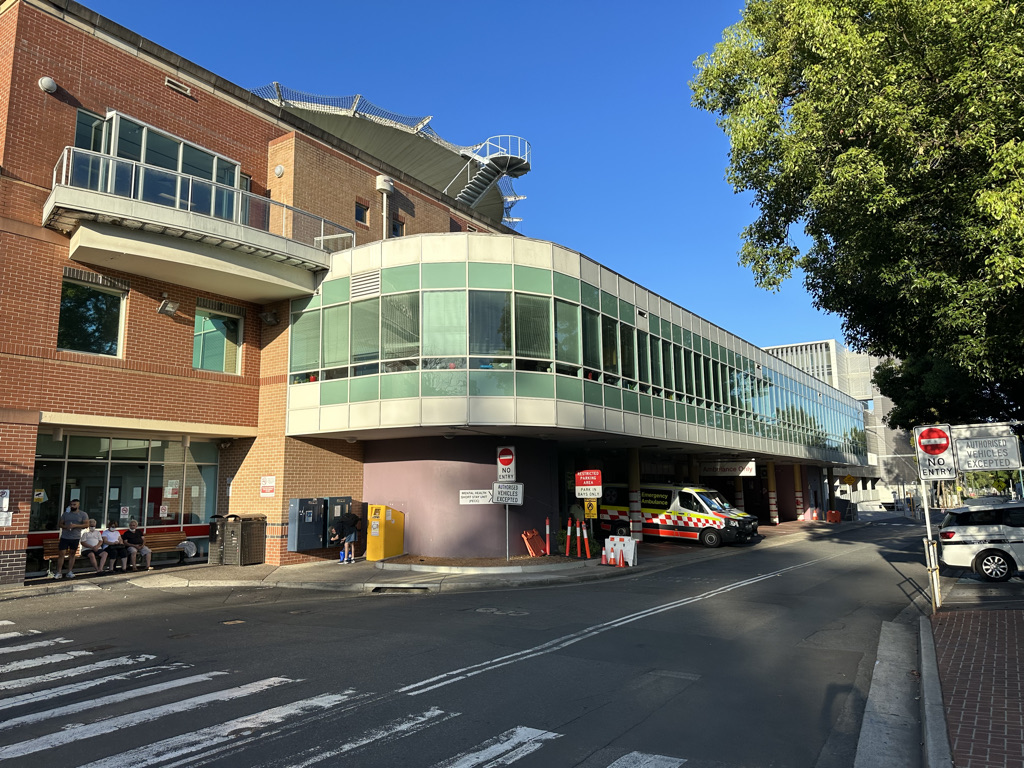
- Liverpool Hospital, New South Wales

Geography
- Location: Elizabeth and Goulburn Streets, Liverpool, New South Wales, Australia
- Coordinates: 33°55′11″S 150°55′49″E

Organisation
- Care system: Medicare (Australia)
- Type: District General, Teaching
- Affiliated university: University of New South Wales; Western Sydney University
- Network: NSW Health

Services
- Emergency department: Yes; Adult Major Trauma Centre
- Beds: 960

Helipads
- Helipad: (ICAO: YXLH)
Number	Length		Surface
Number	ft	m	Surface
1			concrete
2			concrete

Links
- Website: www.swslhd.health.nsw.gov.au/liverpool/

Liverpool Hospital is major district general hospital located in the South Western Sydney suburb of Liverpool, New South Wales, Australia and is a 50-minute drive from the Sydney CBD. It is the second largest hospital in New South Wales (behind Westmead Hospital) and one of the leading trauma centres in Australia.

It has a maximum capacity of 960 beds, 23 operating rooms and 60 critical care beds, diagnostic and imaging services, emergency and trauma care, maternity, paediatric, cancer care, mental health, ambulatory care, allied health and medical and surgical services from birth to aged care.

The hospital is the major health service for South Western Sydney, providing services to the local government area of Liverpool City Council as well as district services to residents and visitors in the area. It also provides a range of statewide services in areas such as critical care and trauma, neonatal intensive care and brain injury rehabilitation.

Liverpool Hospital sits within an education and health precinct which includes the Ingham Institute of Applied Medical Research, Clinical Schools of the University of New South Wales and Western Sydney University, South West Private Hospital and South Western Sydney TAFE.

It is a principal teaching hospital of the University of New South Wales and the Western Sydney University and continues to have an active education programme for medical practitioners, nurses and health professionals, with a range of clinical placements available for students from universities around Australia.

== See also ==
- Health care in Australia
- Lists of hospitals
- List of hospitals in Australia
