= Protests against responses to the COVID-19 pandemic =

2020–2022 worldwide events

- Part of the COVID-19 pandemic and COVID-19 misinformation and COVID-19 misinformation by governments
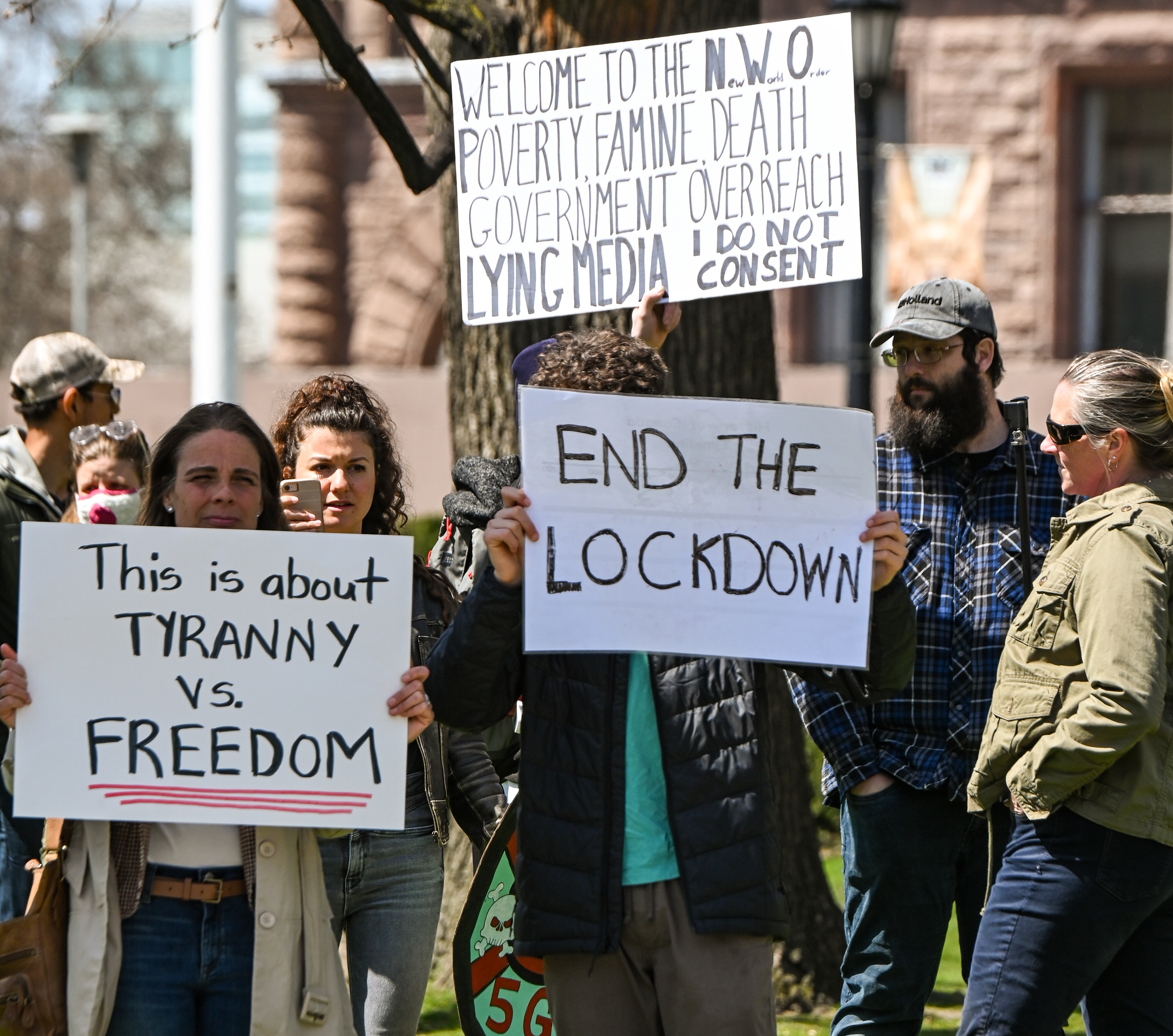
- An anti-lockdown protest at Queen's Park in Toronto, Canada, on 25 April 2020
- Date: 15 March 2020 – 5 December 2022 (2 years, 8 months, 2 weeks and 6 days)
- Location: Worldwide
- Caused by: Local struggles or opposition to government responses to the COVID-19 pandemic
- Goals: Revocation of COVID-19 lockdowns, mask mandates, or vaccine mandates
- Methods: Mass protests; Civil unrest; Riots; Vandalism; Occupations

Protests, demonstrations and strikes occurred around the world against national responses to the COVID-19 pandemic by governmental bodies. Some were driven by the financial hardship resulting from government measures to contain the virus, including restrictions on travel and entertainment, hitting related industries and workers hard. Protests also occurred in opposition to restrictions on people's movements, compulsory wearing of face masks, lockdowns, vaccinations and other measures that have been criticized for violating autonomy and freedom.

This article lists and summarizes such activities in various countries around the world.

== Background ==
=== Reasons ===
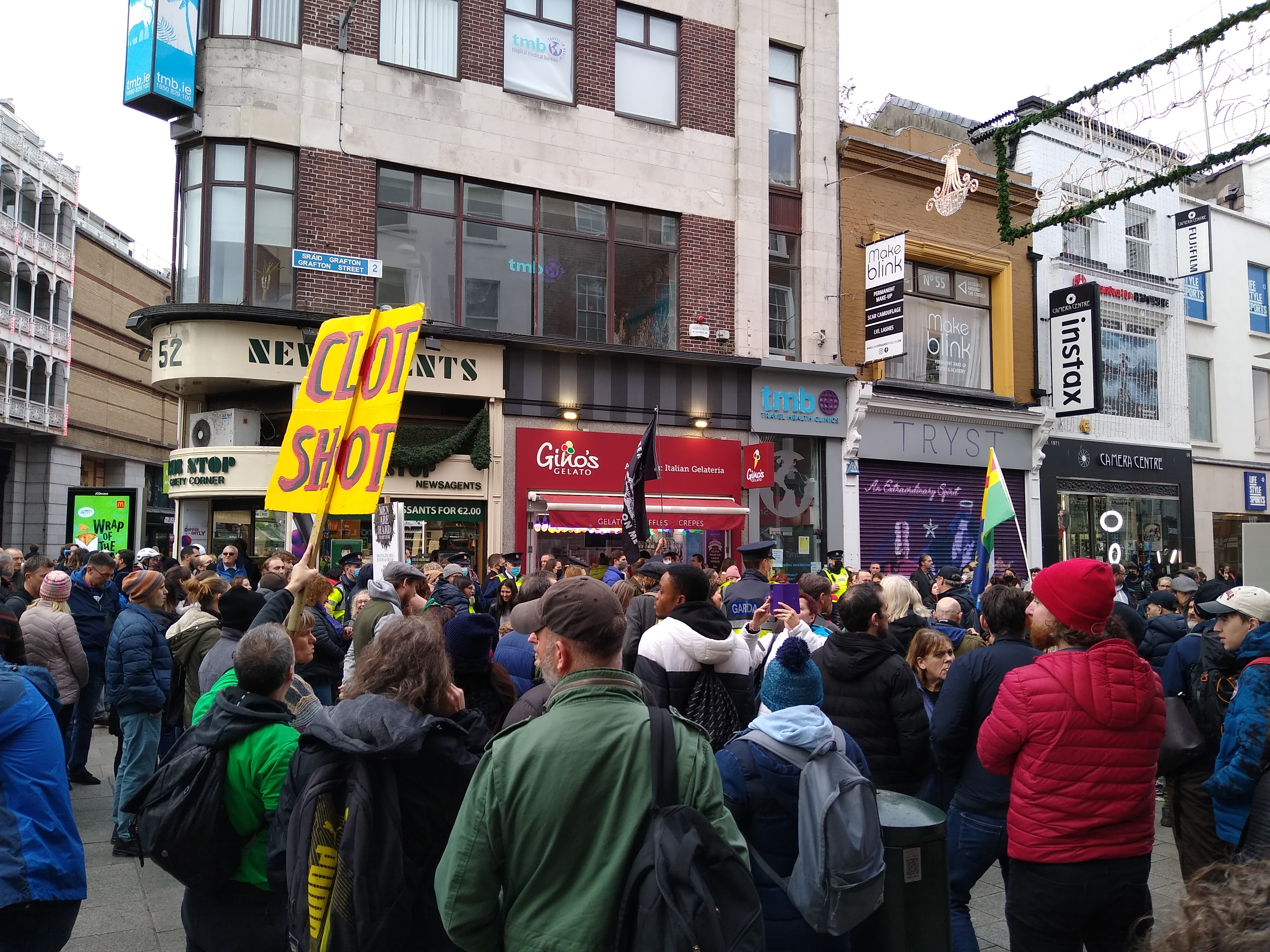
Protest against the COVID-19 vaccine in Dublin, Ireland.

In order to prevent the spread of the SARS-CoV2 virus which gave rise to the COVID-19 pandemic from 2019, governments brought in health measures at varying levels of strictness to restrict the movement of people and transmission of the virus. In response to these restrictions, protests have been organised at a number of locations around the world, and strikes have also occurred.

Some of the protests have criticised governments for not acting effectively enough in their responses to the pandemic, while others have been opposed to preventative measures and called for their revocation. Protesters claimed that stay-at-home orders infringed upon constitutional rights, viewing the mandates as excessive governmental control and violating personal freedoms and civil liberties. Government officials were also criticized for their inconsistency and hypocrisy in regards to pandemic guidelines. According to analysis as part of the Global Peace Index, as of July 2021, there had been around 50,000 protests linked to the pandemic worldwide, 5,000 of which were violent. COVID-19 lockdowns have inspired protests in many territories, and from late 2020 deployment of COVID-19 vaccines also inspired protests.

The protests have varied in scale, motivations and type, with protesters drawn from a fairly wide range of backgrounds and inspired by a range of reasons. One of the main drivers has been the economic distress brought about by businesses having to close for long periods, leading to widespread unemployment, especially of casual workers in the hospitality industry. Uncertainty about the future and the feeling of lack of control has led to a predilection for believing in conspiracy theories, such as that COVID-19 is a hoax and that governments have deliberately created the crisis.

A majority of the protesters have aligned themselves on the political right. The Telegram and Instagram apps were popular means for spreading messages about planned protests, and some events were also posted on Facebook.

== Africa ==
=== Ivory Coast ===
Protesters destroyed a coronavirus testing centre that was being built in Abidjan, which they said was in a crowded residential area too close to their homes.

=== Kenya ===
The Kenyan government has been accused of extreme measures, with protesters accusing the Kenyan Police of killing at least six people within the first 10 days of the lockdown. Others protested against the forced quarantine of individuals failing to comply with regulations or returning home from abroad, claiming that they had been quarantined for longer than 14 days and made to pay the government for their care. Hundreds protested on 8 May 2020 when the government destroyed 7,000 homes and a market in Kariobangi in an effort to control the virus.

=== Malawi ===
A Malawi high court temporarily barred the government from implementing a 21-day lockdown after it was challenged by the Human Rights Defenders Coalition, after it was argued that more consultation was needed to prevent harm to the poorest and most vulnerable. Small protests had been staged prior to the ruling, in at least three major cities with some protesters stating it was better to contract the virus than die of hunger due to lack of work.

=== Nigeria ===
A group of at least twenty coronavirus patients forced their way out of an isolation facility to protest against alleged improper care and the government's actions which they believed to worsen their conditions. Workers at a construction site rioted against lockdown measures that limited their ability to work on constructing an oil refinery for billionaire Aliko Dangote.

=== Rwanda ===
Refugees that had been relocated to the country from an overcrowded refugee camp in Libya, protested against the lockdown from the refugee camp in the capital Kigali.

=== South Africa ===
Many residents protested against the policy that food parcel aid would only be going to households that earn below R3600, and demanded action from the South African Social Security Agency. Surfers have also protested to be allowed to surf during the lockdown, that allows exercise but not water activities.

=== Zimbabwe ===
Three young, female opposition activists were reported missing following a protest in Harare, Zimbabwe, over COVID-19 lockdown measures on 15 May 2020. They were later treated at a hospital after asserting they had been abducted and sexually abused by suspected state security agents.

== Asia ==
=== China (mainland) ===
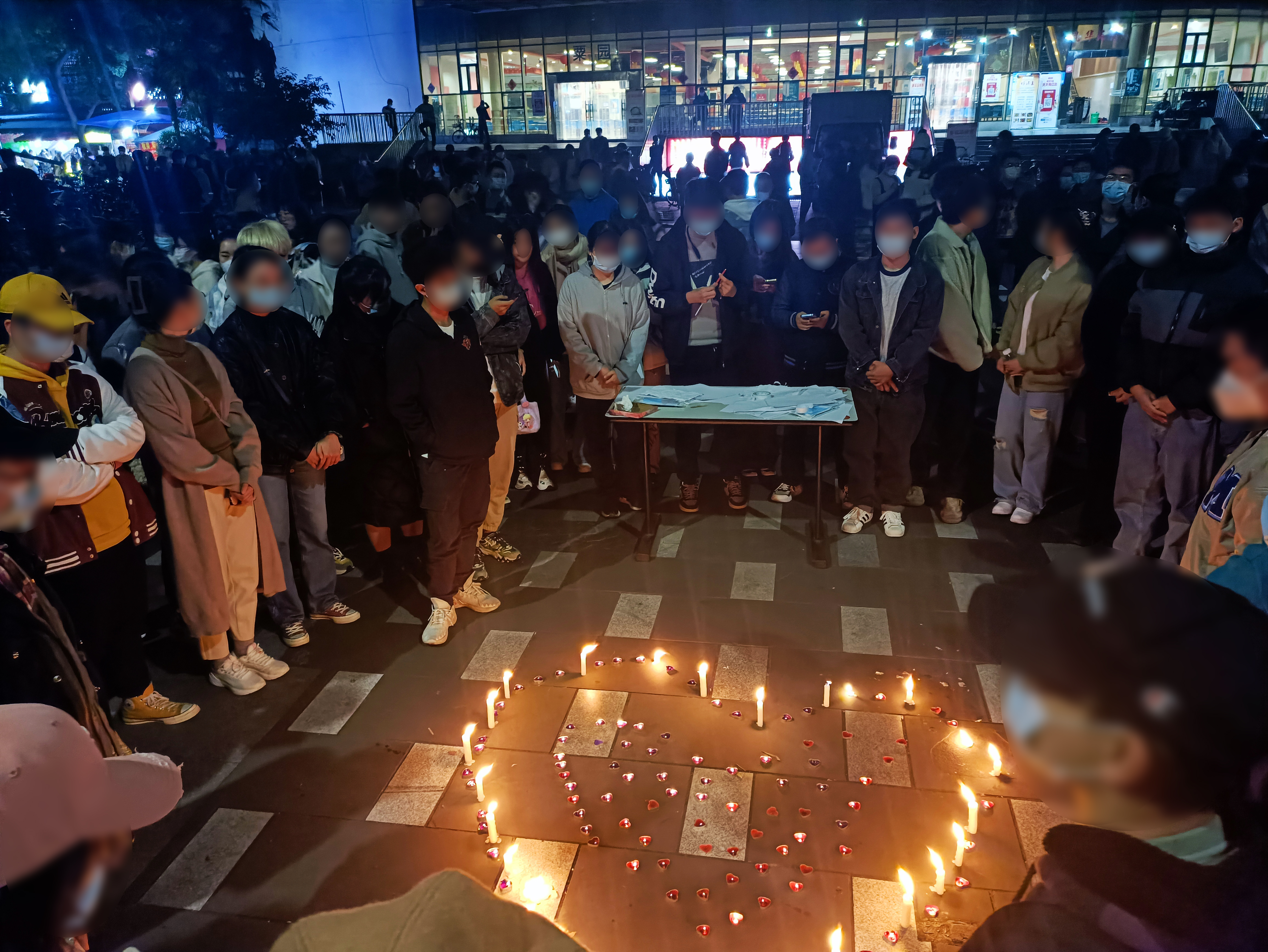
Students at Southwest Jiaotong University, Chengdu, holding a candlelight vigil for victims of the fire in Ürümqi.

Small shop owners protested the continuation of rent charges outside of the Grand Ocean Department Store in Wuhan, chanting "Exempt rental for a year, or refund the lease". Videos from the demonstration were posted in the social media platform Sina Weibo but quickly censored. A woman was arrested and facing criminal charges after attempting to rally about 100 people to protest the poor management and overpriced provisions during the lockdown. She was charged with "picking quarrels and provoking trouble", an offense normally used to detain dissidents and social activists.

In 2022, public protests and marches began in cities such as Ürümqi and Guangzhou in response to the continued zero-COVID policy of the Chinese Communist Party under general secretaryship of Xi Jinping. In Shanghai, some protesters among hundreds had chanted "Step down, Xi Jinping! Step down, Communist Party!"

=== Hong Kong ===
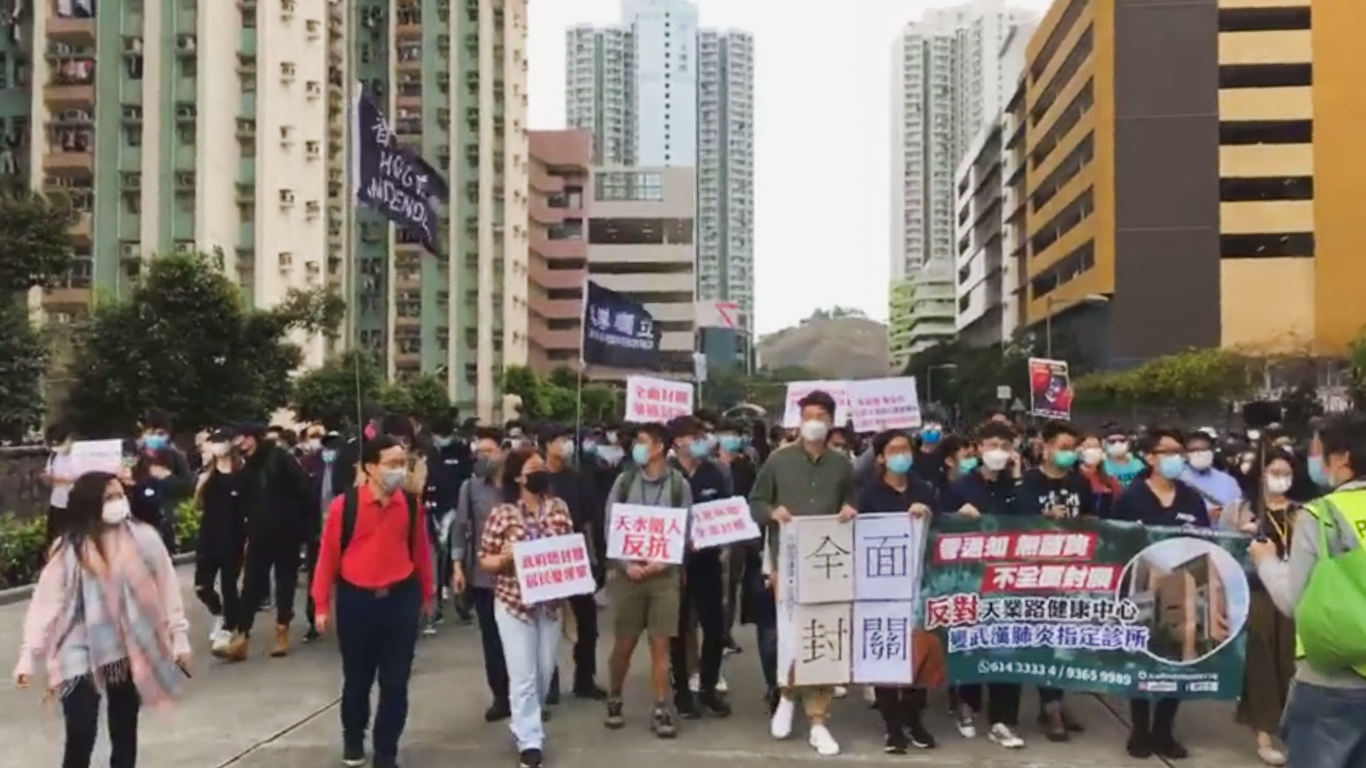
Protest against plans to set up designated coronavirus clinics near residential areas in Hong Kong on 15 February 2020

Pro-democratic movement's tactics were repurposed to pressure the government to take stronger actions to safeguard Hong Kong's public health in the face of the coronavirus outbreak in Hong Kong. Protesters demanded all travellers coming from China be banned from entering Hong Kong. From 3 to 7 February 2020, hospital staff launched a labour strike with the same goal. The strike was not successful as Carrie Lam rejected a full border closure.

People responded negatively to the government's attempt to set up quarantine and clinical centres in neighbourhoods close to residents and marched to express their discontent or blocked roads to thwart the government's plans across the territory.

=== India ===
After the televised announcement by Prime Minister Narendra Modi that the lockdown was to be extended until at least 3 May, police used batons to disperse protesting migrant workers in Mumbai. Thousands of jobless migrant workers had gathered at railway stations and were demanding to be allowed to break the lockdown to return home. Similar protests were seen in other parts of the country by the workers, and those who claimed that they received no aid which was promised by the government to provide them with during the lockdown period.

In the state of Meghalaya, anti-mandatory vaccination protesters organized a rally in the capital city Shillong against the alleged mandatory inoculation drive by the state government.

In the state of Maharashtra, similar protests against mandatory masks were held.

Several legal cases were filed in multiple high courts of India and the Supreme Court of India against mandatory masking and vaccinations.

=== Indonesia ===
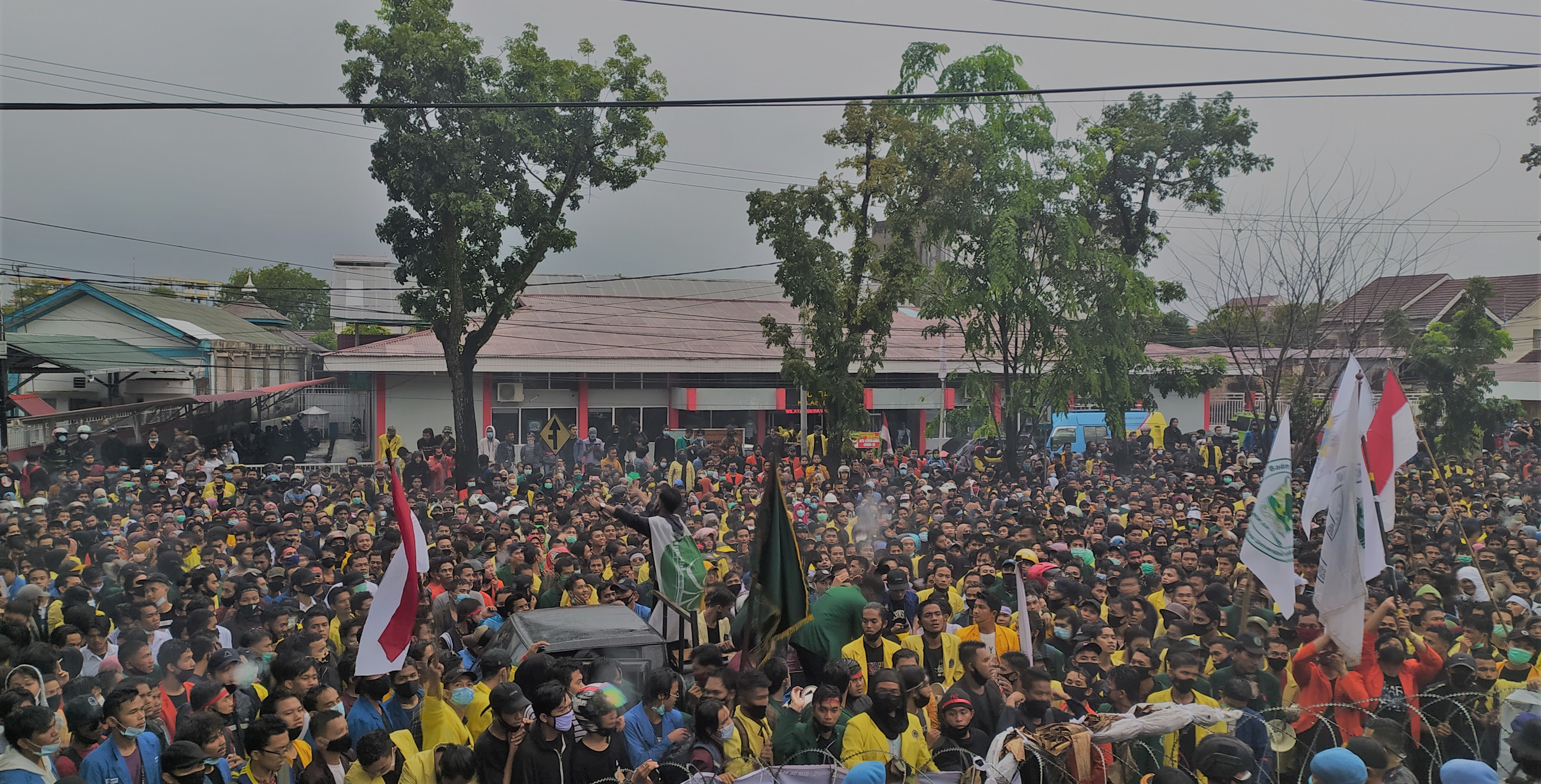
Protest in Padang on 7 October 2020

On 5 October 2020, Indonesia has passed a law on job creation that will weaken environmental protections and workers’ rights in an attempt to boost the economy hit hard by the Wuhan pneumonia pandemic. On 6 October, thousands of Indonesians protest in industrial areas around Jakarta including Tangerang and Karawang and on Batam. A three-day national strike was started which unions expected to involve two million workers in protest against the law.

Demonstrations in Bandung and Jakarta were held on 22 July and 24 July respectively in order to protest the extension of the government's "social activities restriction" (PPKM/CARE) measures.

=== Israel ===
In April 2020, thousands of Israelis engaged in social distancing while gathering to protest against the perceived anti-democratic measures in the country by Prime Minister Benjamin Netanyahu. Many were involved in the Black Flag movement which had been allowed to protest by police if they stood six feet apart and all wore masks. An earlier protest had seen the protesters drive to Jerusalem to protest anti-democratic measures. Other demonstrations have been seen in the ultra-Orthodox Jerusalem neighborhood of Mea Shearim with men and youths throwing rocks at police before being arrested. Riots broke out in Bnei Brak with crowds vandalizing property and throwing rocks against police attempts to clear yeshiva classes and religious gatherings being held in violation of lockdown rules.

=== Iraq ===
Protests against the lockdown have been coupled with the ongoing protests against the current government and female-targeting violence within the country.

=== Kazakhstan ===
In April 2020, following the announcement of quarantine measures, videos of hospital staff in Atyrau protesting against the new rules were circulated on social media, leading to the detention of several journalists who reported on the incident.

On 25 January 2021, a demonstration was held in the city of Kokshetau, where citizens expressed discontent with the concept of compulsory COVID-19 vaccination. The deputy akim met with the crowd and assured them that vaccination would remain a personal choice.

In response to the government's vaccine mandate for all in-person employees, protests took place across Kazakhstan on 6 July 2021. Protesters demanded an end to fines imposed on business owners who refused to enforce vaccination among workers, as well as free PCR testing for the unvaccinated. In Oral, instructions were distributed to the crowd advising how to avoid inoculation. Reports of detentions by police occurred in Almaty and Aktobe that day.

On 17 July 2021, demonstrations continued in several cities. In Pavlodar, around one hundred people gathered at the central square before being dispersed by security forces; some protesters were detained and pushed into police vans, while others managed to flee.

During the 2022 unrest in Kazakhstan, oil workers in Zhanaozen, protesting against rising liquefied petroleum gas prices, also demanded the abolition of mandatory COVID-19 vaccination. As the protests gained momentum, the unrest expanded beyond economic grievances, with participation calls spreading across social media, particularly in Almaty, for rallies against forced vaccination and the use of check-in QR codes.

=== Lebanon ===
Many protesters argued for monetary relief from the countries slumping economy after weeks of the lockdown. At least one demonstrator died after soldiers used tear gas, batons, and live bullets to disperse a protesters in Tripoli who were throwing molotov cocktails. Protesters also congregated in Beirut outside the central bank and threw rocks at the building, and took over major roads as they claimed there wasn't enough done to protect the economy and those that would suffer the most economically.

=== Malaysia ===
On 31 July 2021, hundreds of protesters attempted to gather in Merdeka Square, Kuala Lumpur, calling for the resignation of Prime Minister Muhyiddin Yassin over his and the Malaysian government's handling of the COVID-19 pandemic. The protests took place despite Movement Control Order (MCO) restrictions being in place, and Malaysian police blocking access to Merdeka Square itself. The anti-government protests took place following a state of emergency declaration, where parliament and elections were suspended, and amid an ongoing political crisis. On 2 August, including former Prime Minister Mahathir Mohamad, opposition MPs held a protest in Merdeka Square after being blocked from entering Parliament by police.

=== Nepal ===
On 12 June 2020, hundreds of protesters gathering in the capital city Kathmandu, demanding better quarantine facilities, more tests and transparency in the purchase of medical supplies to fight the crisis. Ten people have been arrested, including seven foreigners.

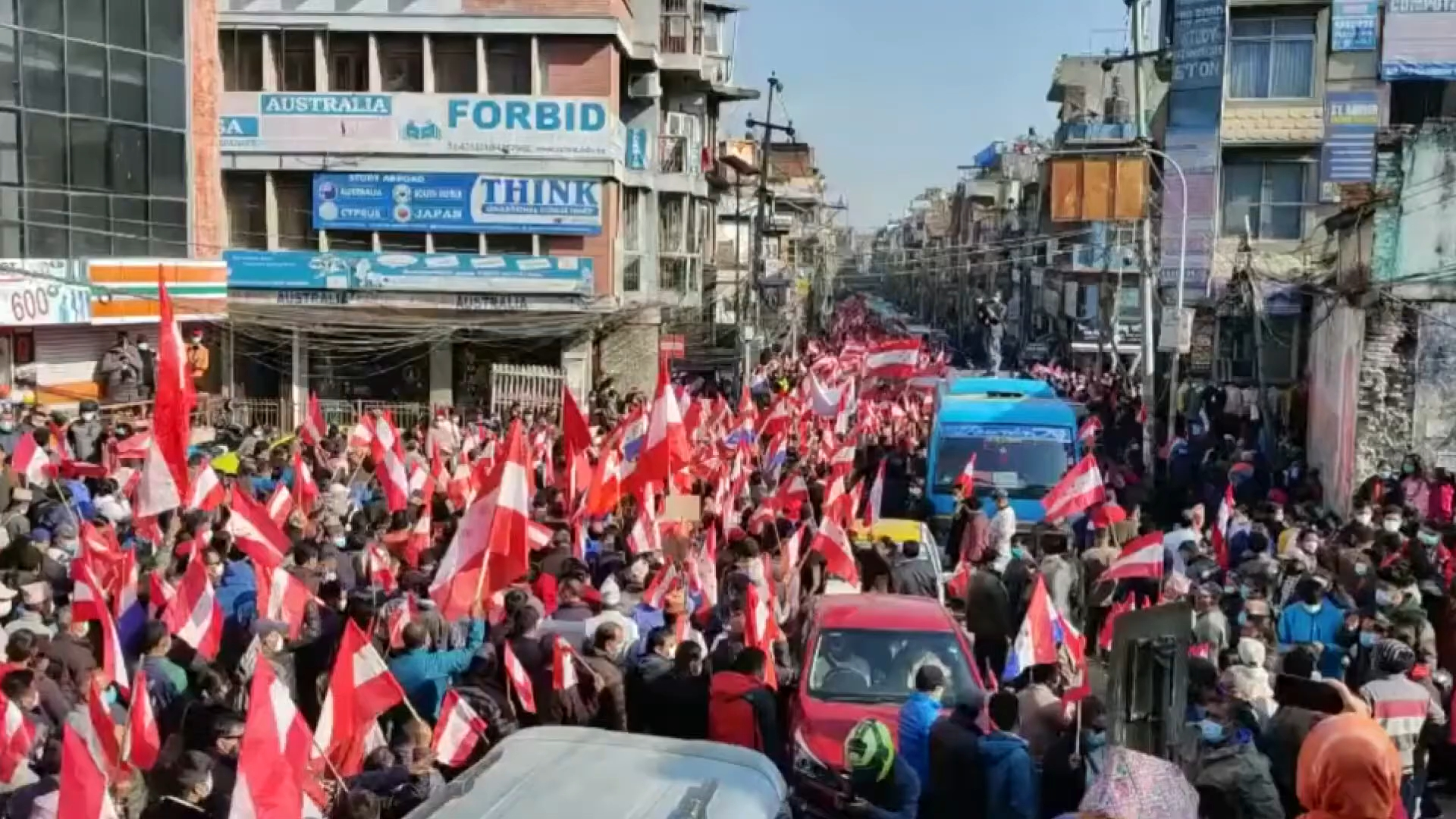
Protesters wave party flags of the Nepali Congress on 14 December 2020

On 14 December 2020, the Nepali Congress, Nepal's largest opposition party, launched a nationwide protest, claiming that one million people participated. This protest is mainly to criticize the government for not actively fighting the COVID-19 pandemic and for not actively preparing for holding the winter session of federal parliament.

=== Pakistan ===
Dozens of doctors were arrested in Quetta after protesting the lack of safety equipment that they had been given to battle the spread of the disease. Hundreds of laborers protested against their forced layoffs due to the pandemic by gathering outside their old places of work throughout the city of Karachi.

Parents of students who had been studying abroad in the Chinese province of Hubei protested against the government's decision to leave the children in the area in February 2020.

=== Philippines ===
Spontaneous demonstrations were held on 1 April 2020 by a Quezon City urban poor community to protest lack of food and other assistance during the metropolitan-wide COVID-19 lockdown. Police violently dispersed protesters and arrested 21 people. The city mayor and a Congress representative appealed to police to release those arrested.

In May 2020, journalists and individuals protested the cease and desist order that led to the shutdown of media giant ABS-CBN, a move that jeopardized more than 11,000 jobs and prevented the broadcast of vital information about the pandemic. More protests were held after the House of Representatives junked ABS-CBN's application for a legislative franchise.

Jeepney drivers rendered jobless by the COVID-19 emergency protested in Caloocan on 3 June 2020. Six protesters were arrested and jailed for a few days to one week.

Several groups held protests nationwide to coincide with the commemoration of Philippine Independence on 12 June 2020. Among these was the "Grand Mañanita" protest at the University of the Philippines in Quezon City. The Grand Mañanita protested the government's response to the COVID-19 crisis and Congress' passage of a controversial anti-terror bill.

On 16 July 2021, health workers held a protest in front of the headquarters of Department of Health (DOH) where they threw tomatoes at the logo of the DOH. On 30 August, 1 September and 24 November 2021, health workers from various hospitals in Metro Manila held a protest at the DOH headquarters over nonpayment of their salaries and benefits and demanding Duque (and Duterte) to resign over the handling of the COVID-19 pandemic in the country.

=== Thailand ===
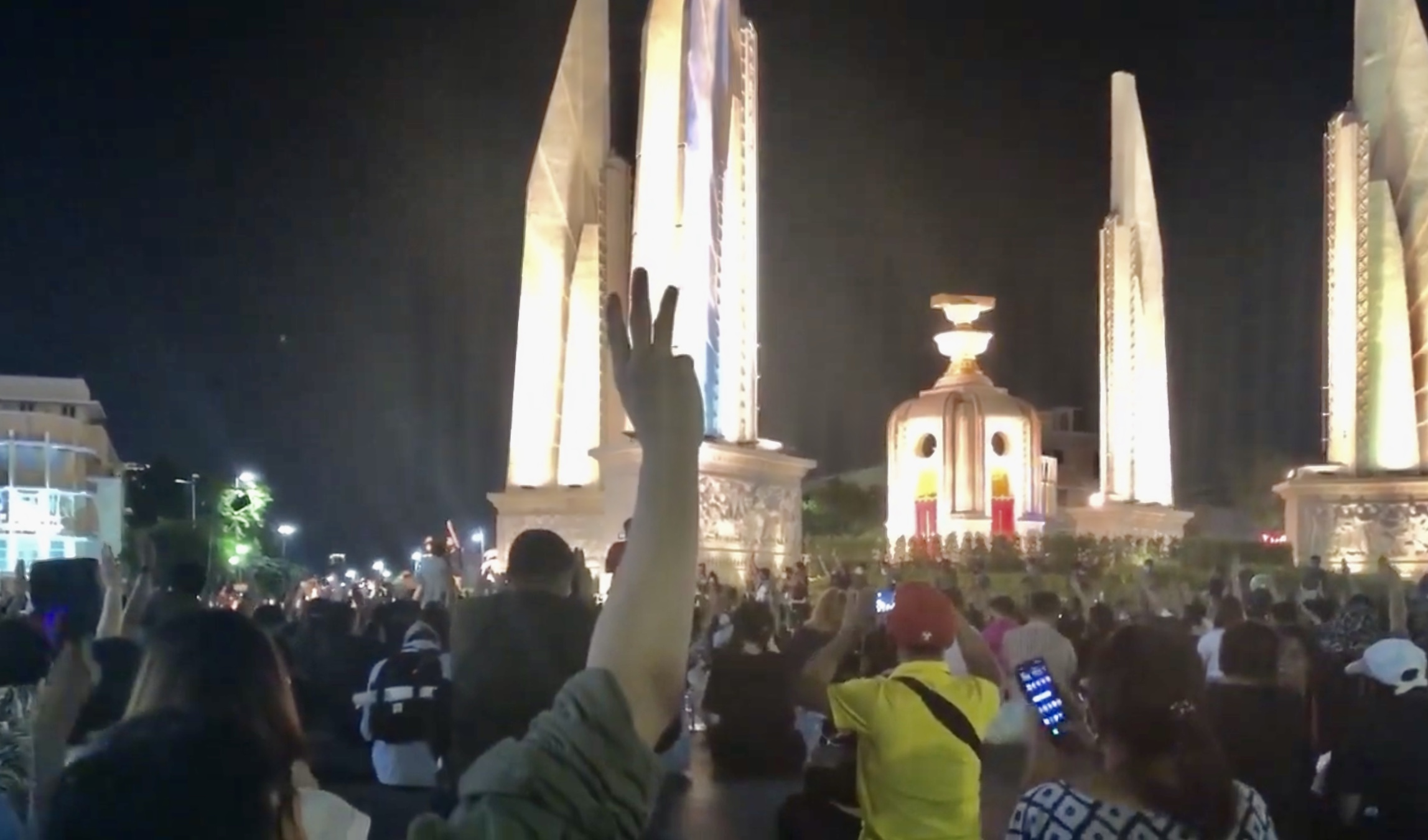
Demonstrations at the Democracy Monument, Bangkok at night

On 18 July, Thailand saw the largest street demonstration since the 2014 Thai coup d'état at the Democracy Monument in Bangkok with around 2,500 protesters. The protesters, organised under the name Free Youth (Thai: เยาวชนปลดแอก; yaowachon plod aek), announced three demands: dissolution of the House, stop threatening the people and drafting of a new constitution. The event was triggered by the failed economy due to pandemic, and unjustified implementation of the COVID-19 acts that were heavily criticised as being a tool against any possible protest. The situation erupted after two COVID-19 cases; an Egyptian soldier in Rayong Province, and a Sudanese diplomat's daughter in Asok neighbourhood of Bangkok, were tested positive earlier on 15 July. Both were excepted from COVID-19's travel restrictions and containment. Many criticised on both the government's failure to contain the disease from these VIPs, and its failure to boost the heavily affected tourism industry in Rayong Province. The protesters demanded the government to accept within two weeks, or face larger demonstrations.

Later on 19 July, several protests erupted in Chiang Mai Province and Ubon Ratchathani Province.

=== Vietnam ===
There have been many protests broke out in some localities in Vietnam to protest against the anti-epidemic policy, as well as to call on the government to support people during the pandemic.

On August 22, 2021, workers at an isolation area in Binh Duong province conducted a riot, smashed, and prevented a pregnant woman from going to the emergency room.

On August 27, some people in Ho Chi Minh City reacted because they had not received local support money and the clip of this incident was posted on social networks. The government has forced "hostile forces to plot to incite demonstrations and fight against social distancing".

On October 1, 2021, people in Ho Chi Minh City protested, attacking police at a checkpoint on the outskirts of the city to open the door for people to return to their hometown. A day later, Vietnamese netizens spread images of police forces and militiamen using sticks to beat protesters in Binh Duong with the purpose of breaking the gate to return to their hometown. The local government then stated to verify the incident, at the same time accused people of rioting and attacking the police.

In mid-October, after the dogs of a household in Ca Mau province were culled due to suspicion of being infected with the COVID-19 virus, there were many online calls for people to protest against the anti pandemic policies from the government.

In November 2021, those present at the funeral of Mr. Duong Van Minh, a Hmong man, clashed with police after police and local medical staff asked those present at the funeral to disperse. due to fears of an outbreak. Mr. Duong Van Minh is the founder of the religious organization that bears his name, which is considered a heresy by Vietnamese authorities.

From October 2022, a year after the end of social distancing due to the pandemic, many customers of Sai Gon Joint Stock Commercial Bank (SCB), one of Vietnam's major banks, protested at the bank branch to request a refund of a customer's bond purchase. The protests were considered to be motivated by the difficult economic and financial situation of the people after the pandemic.

== Europe ==
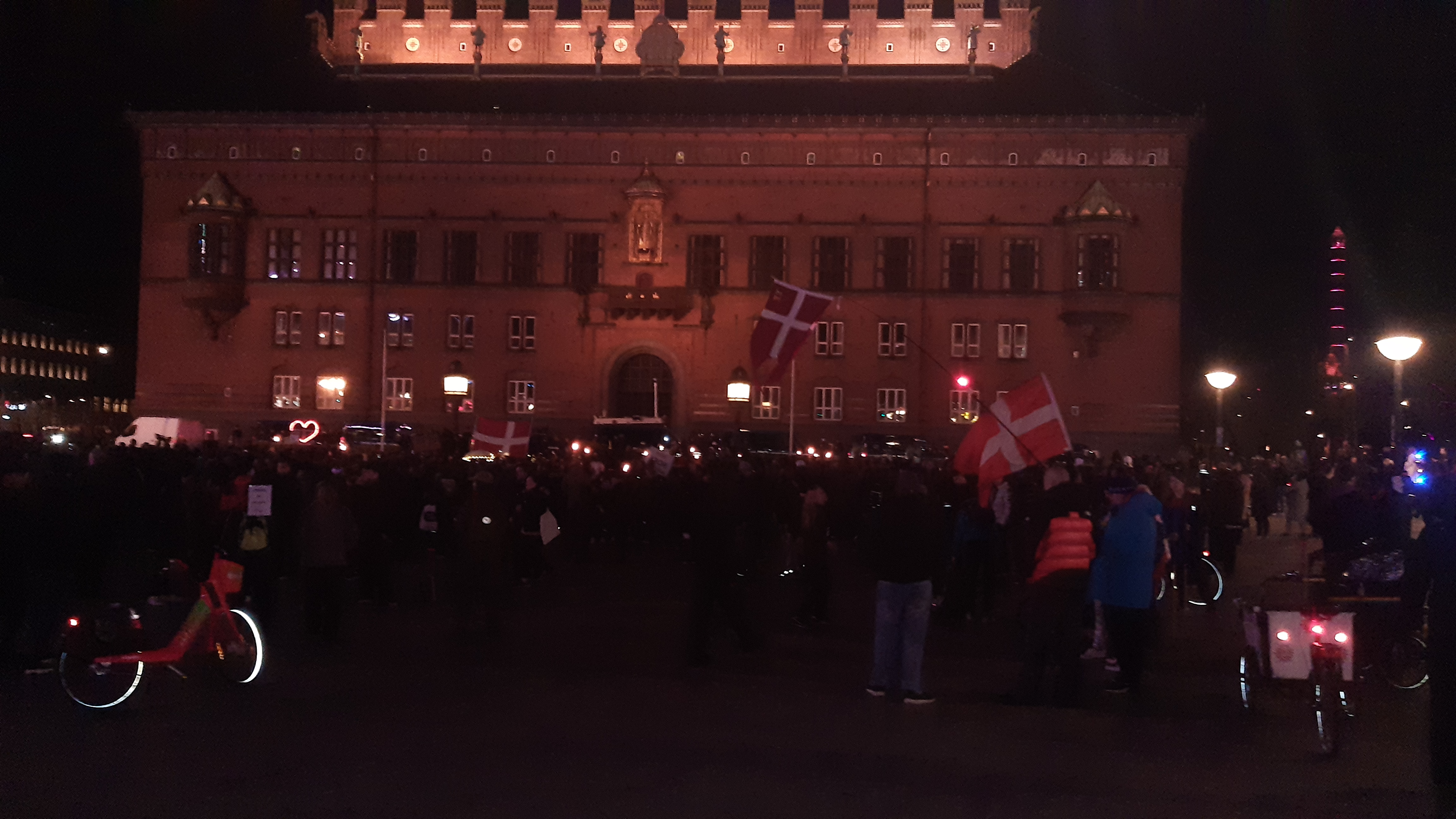
Anti-lockdown demonstration in Rådhuspladsen, Copenhagen, 27 March 2021

=== Austria ===
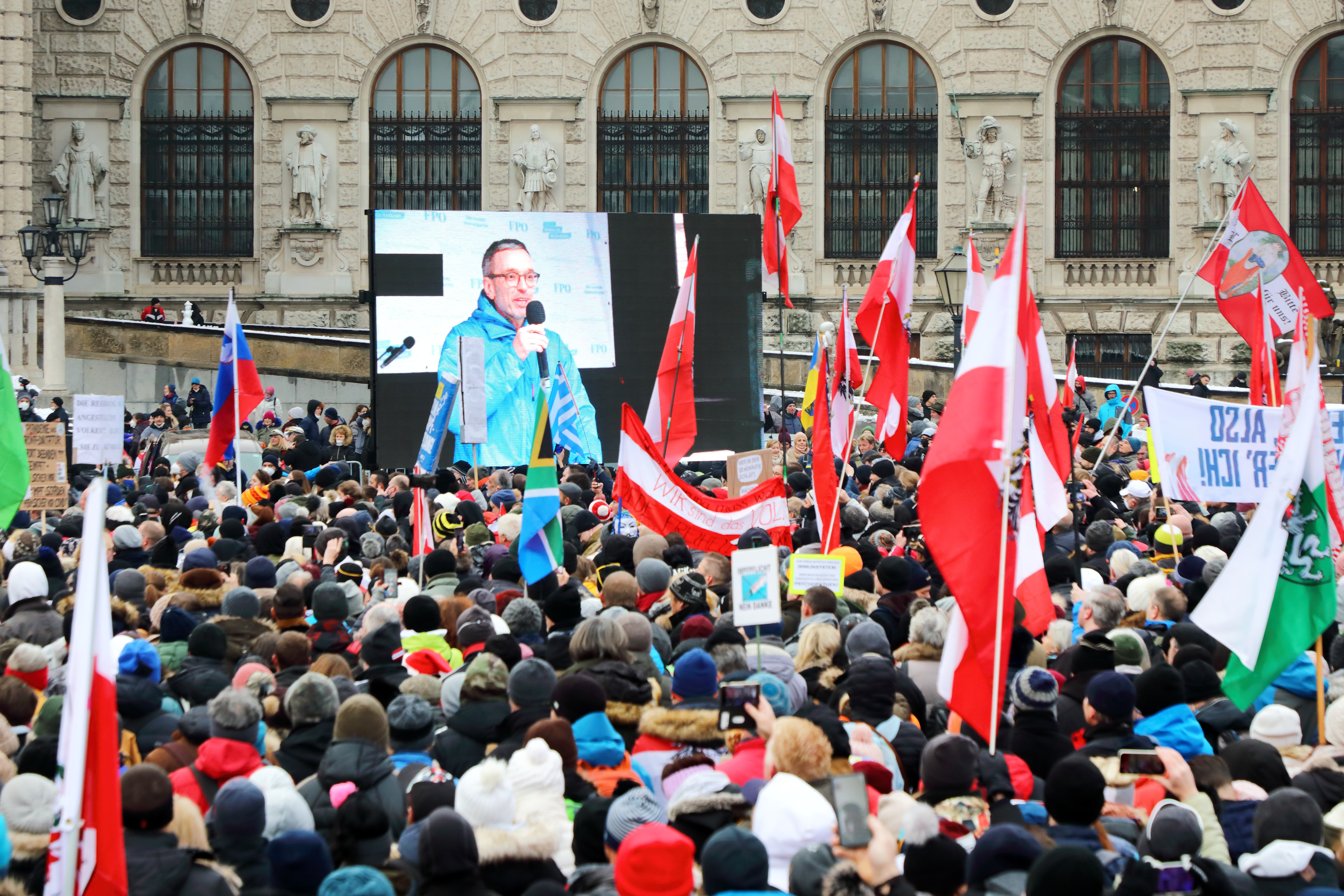
Herbert Kickl leader of Freedom Party of Austria, as speaker at the anti-corona measures demonstration on December 11, 2021, in Vienna

The newly created Fundamental Rights Party (MFG), has been planning recent anti-lockdown protests in Austria. The group compared Covid restrictions with "Nazi rule". The country's third largest political party, the Freedom Party of Austria (FPÖ), has also strongly condemned the Covid restrictions, and its new leader, Herbert Kickl, has pushed misleading and false views of the virus, including claims that the vaccination programme is really a "genetic experiment". Kickl urged a public crowd to reject compulsory vaccinations. Fifteen thousand people later rallied at the Heldenplatz square in Vienna to protest against the anti-Covid measures and were later joined by thousands more, with approximately 44,000 people taking part in the rally in total.

=== Azerbaijan ===
In June 2020, Azerbaijan faced public backlash against its COVID-19 measures. During a strict weekend lockdown, police in the Yasamal raion of Baku arrested a man for allegedly violating quarantine rules. When residents protested by throwing garbage from their balconies, authorities launched a large-scale operation the next morning, detaining 11 people, some reportedly beaten during arrest. Videos of the incident spread widely online, sparking nationwide outrage over heavy-handed enforcement. Some citizens protested by shouting from their windows, while activists displayed banners criticizing the police response.

In July 2020, Azerbaijan saw major protests following border clashes with Armenia. While driven largely by patriotic sentiment, the demonstrations also reflected broader frustration with COVID-19 restrictions, with some protesters calling for an end to quarantine measures.

=== Belgium ===
On 31 January 2021, police in Brussels said they had arrested more than 400 people to prevent a banned protest of anti-COVID-19 measures. On 21 November 2021, about 35,000 people in the streets of Brussels took part in demonstration, which began peaceful before violence broke out. Waving nationalist flags of Flanders and banners against the more restrictive rules for the unvaccinated, several people hidden by hoods also attacked some police cars. At least two officers and one protester were injured. Protesters threw stones at police as they advanced with water cannon at the main junction in front of the European Union Commission headquarters. Protesters also threw smoke bombs and fireworks, the newspaper Le Soir reported. The situation calmed down later, police said.

- January 2022 Brussels protest

=== Belarus ===
In May 2020, a lowered approval of authoritarian president Alexander Lukashenko amid his handling of the COVID-19 pandemic led to street protests against his government. Mass protests erupted across Belarus following the August 2020 Belarusian presidential election which was marred by allegations of widespread electoral fraud.

=== Bosnia and Herzegovina ===
On 6 April 2021, anti-governmental protests "Fight for Life" were held by a group of citizens and activists in Bosnia and Herzegovina's capital Sarajevo in front of the Parliamentary Assembly and the Federal Government, seeking resignations from Chairman of the Council of Ministers Zoran Tegeltija and Federal Prime Minister Fadil Novalić, due to lack of leadership during the COVID-19 pandemic in Bosnia and Herzegovina and late procurement of COVID-19 vaccines for the country. Further anti-governmental protests were held eleven days later, on 17 April as well.

=== Bulgaria ===
On 30 March 2020 The Bulgarian Health Ministry issued an order that made not wearing a face mask in public punishable by law at a time when no masks were available for purchasing in the country. After strong public unrest, the order was recalled on the following day and re-instated yet again later, with some modifications. A small protest took place on 19 April 2020 in Sofia against the measures to combat the COVID-19 pandemic, with many of the participants expressing concerns about their livelihoods. Protests with an anti-vax slant that also demanded the resignation of the government, organized by the Vazrazhdane party, were held in May and June, resulting in a few arrests, but did not see a significant turnout.

Public disapproval grew during the pandemic and reached a spontaneous culmination on 9 July 2020 after a police raid on the Presidency of Bulgaria in what was perceived as an attack against President Rumen Radev, a vocal critic of prime minister Boyko Borisov, who has been in power since 2009, and the long-standing grievances against endemic corruption and state capture. Daily demonstrations were held in the country's capital Sofia until April 2021, though the number of protesters dwindled during the autumn and winter months when the country was heavily affected by the COVID-19 pandemic. On 12 January 2022, Vazrazhdane organized a large demonstration against the COVID green certificates for indoor spaces, during which protest participants attempted to make their way into the National Parliament. On 23 February 2022, the party held another protest with the same focus.

=== Czechia ===
In late 2020 and during 2021, many anti-responses protests occurred as the pandemic situation in country worsened and measures, often legally unsubstantiated, were prolonged. Protesters demanded revoking of the restrictions such as gathering limitations or pubs closure. Many of them also refused face-masks wearing, which gave them a nickname "anti-rouškaři", meaning "mask-refusers". The most violent incident occurred on 18 October in Prague, when group of radical protesters, including football hooligans, clashed with police forces after protest was dissolved due to violations of hygienic measures. 20 officers were injured as well as unknown number of protesters. 144 persons were arrested. This is in contrast with mostly peaceful protests which are typical in Czechia. Since then, police has changed a tactics to document offences rather than doing large maneuvers to disperse crowds.

=== France ===
The Paris suburb Villeneuve-la-Garenne saw riots in April 2020, partly about the strains of the coronavirus outbreak and lockdown on working-class families, often immigrants, who live in small apartments in crowded public housing buildings. Many have reported that in poorer neighbourhoods the policies are difficult to follow due to over crowding and cause the neighbourhoods to be impacted more than wealthier Parisians. The demonstrations have since been seen in the suburb Hauts-de-Seine, and other French cities Toulouse, Lyon and Strasbourg.

==== Vaccination obligation, sanitary pass ====
The announcement of president Macron on 12 July 2021 of a COVID-19 vaccination obligation for all health care workers by 15 September, as well as the obligation for people older than twelve to show a "sanitary pass" as of August for admittance to cafés, restaurants, cinemas, hospitals, senior citizens' homes, trains, shopping malls, and other public venues led to protests across France. The 'sanitary pass' should prove that someone is either vaccinated, has recently tested negative, or has recovered from COVID-19. Macron's motivation was: "We are in a new race against time", "Vaccination is the only way to protect yourself and others".

Marine Le Pen, challenger of Macron in the 2022 French presidential election, immediately condemned the vaccination obligation as "indecent insolence" attesting of "ingratitude" towards the health care workers. On Wednesday 14 July, the French National day called 'Bastille Day', in Paris some 2,250 people protested against these new corona restrictions. Demonstrations were also held in Toulouse, Bordeaux, Montpellier, Nantes and 48 other places, totalling around 19,000 protesters. Slogans chanted were: "Down with dictatorship", "Down with the health pass". A demonstrator equated the health pass with "segregation". Objects and fireworks were thrown at the police, who answered with tear gas and arrests.

On Saturday 17 July, nationwide some 114,000 people protested against the two new measures. On 24 July, some 160,000 people around France protested against the measures. Protesters chanted: "Liberty! Liberty!" Projectiles including a chair were thrown at the police in Paris, who reacted with tear gas and water cannons.

On 25 July, the French Senate nevertheless agreed to the measures except the pass obligation for children under 18 years old.

On 31 July, over 200,000 people nationwide protested against these plans. Thousands around Place de la Bastille in Paris chanted: "Liberté!" [Freedom!]. Signs accused Macron of being a dictator. A bus driver motivated his protest as: "I'm not an antivaxer (...) But this is going to fast, I want to wait and see". A hospital worker said: "These vaccines are experimental; there's no way I'm gonna take it". A placard in Paris cited Macron: ' "Je ne rendrai pas la vaccination obligatoire", Emmanuel Macron, Novembre 2020 ' ["I will not make vaccination obligatory", Macron, Nov. 2020]. Another: ' De la démocratie à la dictature il n'y a qu'un <<PASS>> ' [From democracy to dictatorship is only one step [or] one pass]. Another: 'VACCINÉ A LA LIBERTÉ' [VACCINATED FOR FREEDOM].

On Saturday 7 August, 237,000 people protested on 198 locations in France, the authorities reported. In Paris, Lyon, Toulouse, rioters pelted the police with all sorts of things, police reacted with tear gas and charges and arrests. The sanitary pass obligation came into effect on 9 August, civilians risk a fine of 135 euro for disobedience, business owners risk a 45,000 euro fine or one-year prison and the closure of their business.

On 14 August 2021, between 200,000 and 250,000 people according to the police and the organisers have again demonstrated, on more than 200 locations in France, against the pass sanitaire and the obligated vaccination of health care personnel. Placards compared the sanitary pass with 'Apartheid', people chanted slogans about the "health dictatorship". Police in Lyon used pepper spray against rioters.

Since then, these protests grew smaller; on Saturday, 18 September 2021, the demonstrators in France against the sanitary pass and obligated vaccination counted 80,000.

=== Greece ===
The 2021 Greek protests broke out in response to a proposed government bill that would allow police presence on university campuses for the first time in decades, for which opposition groups accused the government of taking advantage of the COVID-19 lockdown to impose increasingly authoritarian measures.

=== Georgia ===
On 5 December 2021 thousands demonstrated in Tbilisi against a COVID-19 passport system which has been implemented in Georgia since December 1, allowing only citizens and tourists with a QR-code proving vaccination or recovery from the virus or with a negative PCR test result to visit public places, restaurants, entertainment and shopping centers. Protesters marched with posters and Georgian flags, passing by the parliamentary building.

=== Germany ===
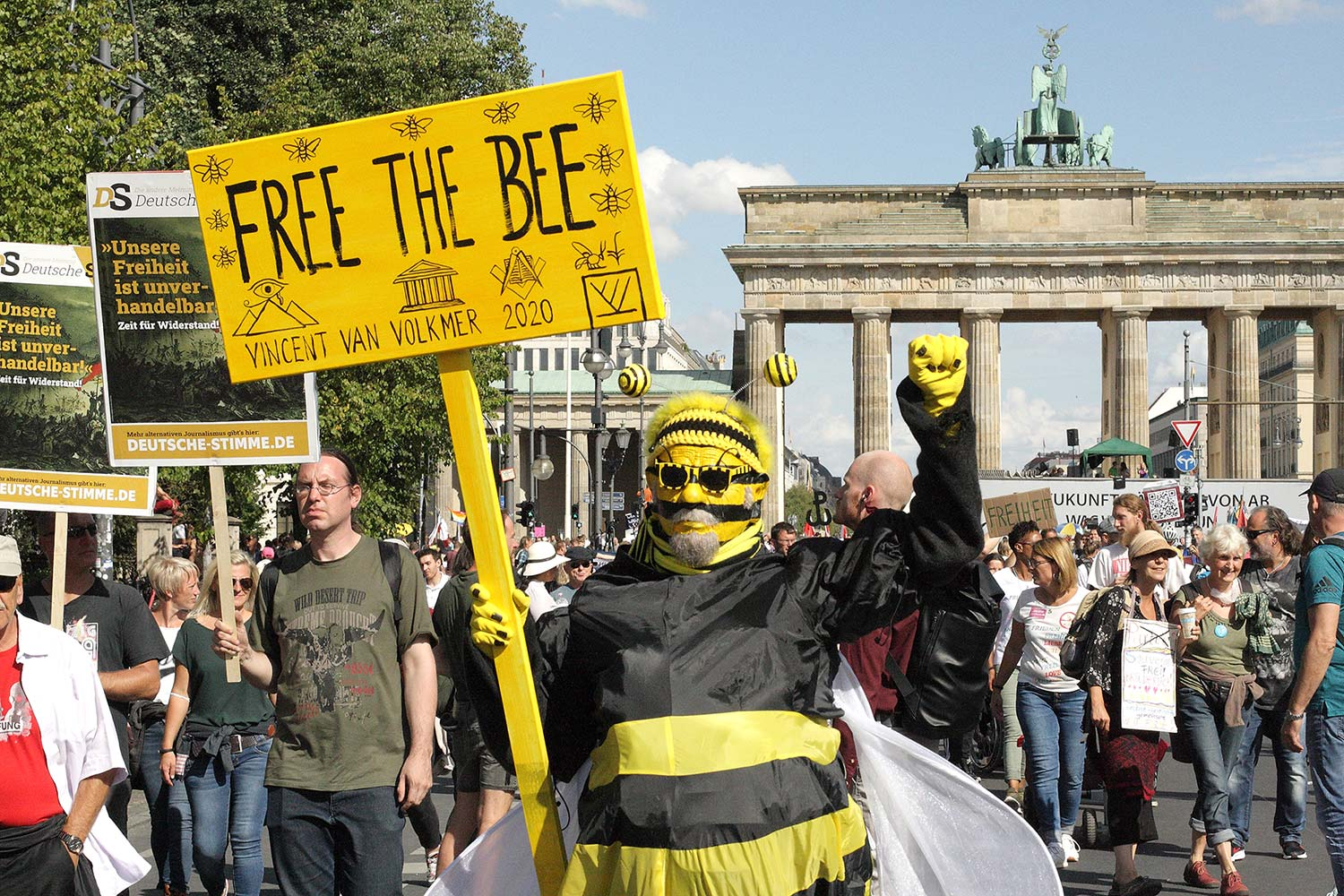
Protester with a "Free The Bee" placard during the COVID-19 protests in Berlin on 29 August 2020, near the Brandenburg Gate

Since April 2020, in Germany numerous protests against government policies over the COVID-19 pandemic have been held in several cities. A protest in Berlin on 29 August was estimated by authorities to have drawn 38,000 participants.

Several of the protests in Germany, like the one of 29 August, were organized by the group Querdenken 711, based in Stuttgart. As per its homepage, it considers its main aims to support the fundamental rights enshrined in the German constitution, in particular the freedoms of opinion, expression, and assembly.

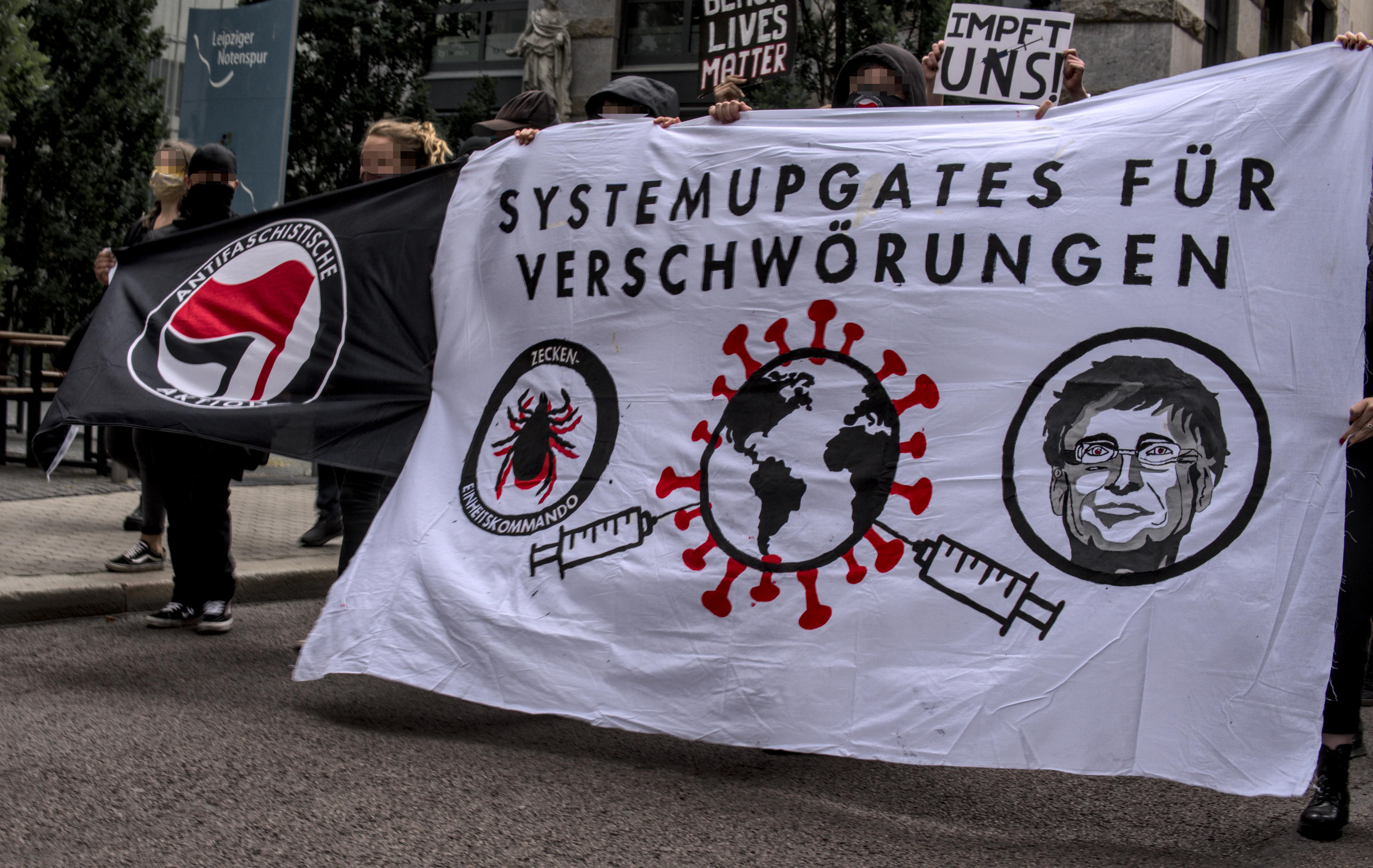
Anarchist anti-conspiracy theory, anti-gentrification protest

At the 29 August demonstration in Berlin, one of the invited orators was Robert F. Kennedy Jr., lawyer and conspiracy theorist and nephew of the assassinated U.S. President John F. Kennedy. He warned the crowd that the COVID-19 measures being deployed in many countries might lead to the implementation of a surveillance state. A few hundred protesters attempted to storm the Reichstag building, the seat of the German parliament; a few of them reached the stairs. A burst of media attention arose due to this incident. Later demonstrations tended to be smaller, and sometimes organized by allies of Querdenken.

Anarchists, libertarian socialists and anti-fascists in Germany have been counterprotesting "Querdenken 711" and other demonstrations against public health mandates. Focusing on increasing gentrification, wealth inequality, evictions, police measures and favoring of compulsory vaccination. Anarchists have seen increasing evictions of anarchist communities and squats.

=== Hungary ===
On 28 February 2021, around 3,000–5,000 protesters gathered in the capital city of Budapest at Hősök tere to protest the lockdown regulations, and the Constitution of 2012.

The far-right Our Homeland Movement organised protests against lockdown measures on 15 March 2021, and against vaccine mandates (a "Covid Dictatorship") throughout December 2021 in various Hungarian cities. On 16 January 2022 they held another anti-vaccine protest in Budapest, attracting thousands of people.

=== Ireland ===
On 24 July 2021, over ten thousand people attended an anti discrimination march in Dublin, in response to the Irish government's announcement that vaccine passports would be introduced. Said passports were to be used to prevent unvaccinated people availing of indoor dining services.

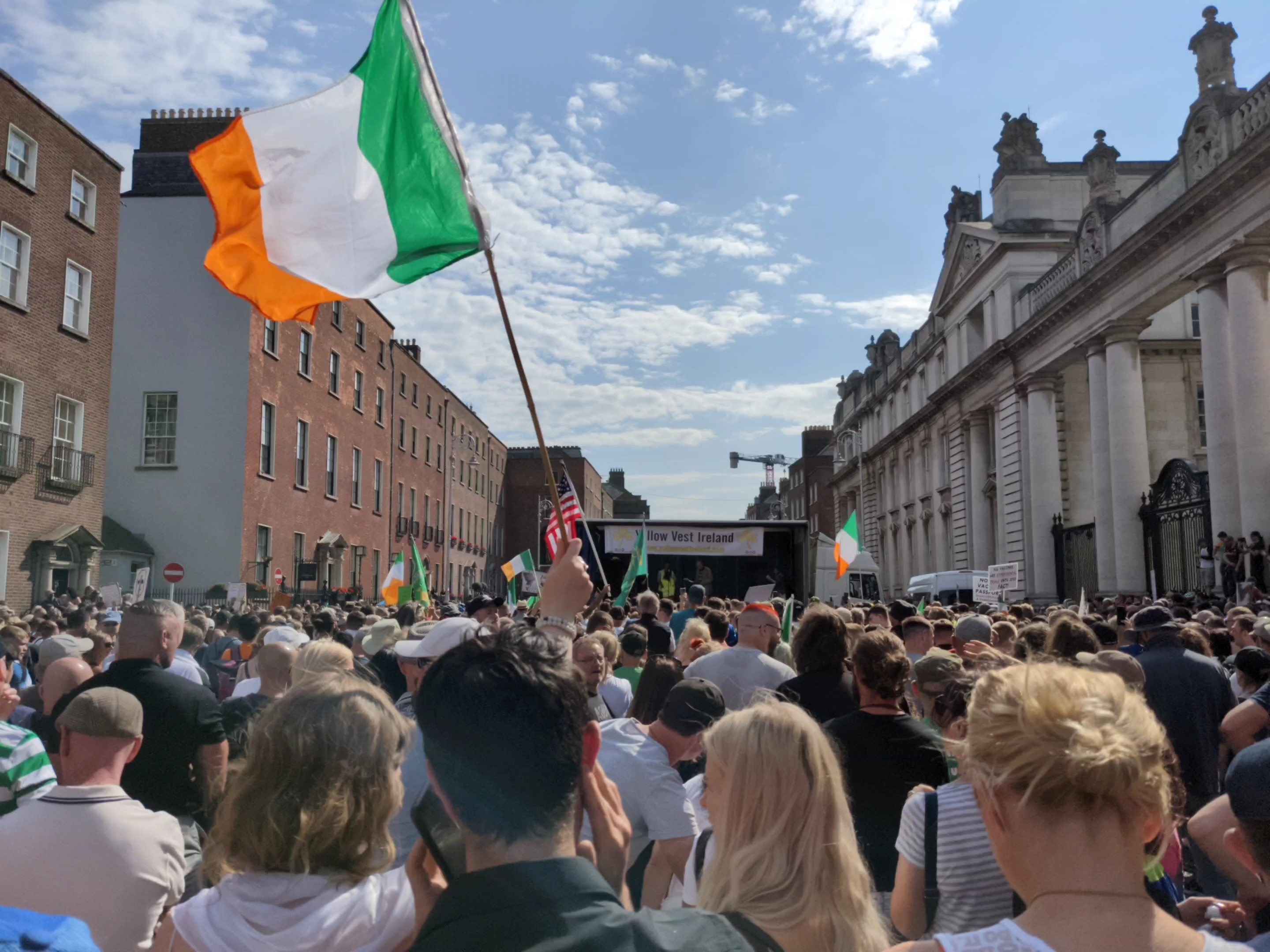
July 24 Anti Discrimination March, Dublin

Hundreds attended an anti-lockdown, anti-face mask protest in Dublin on 22 August 2020. The protest was organised by Health Freedom Ireland with support from Yellow Vest Ireland. Four people were arrested at the protest. Another protest was organised by the same groups on 3 October, with up to a thousand protesters marching through the city centre before staging a sit-down protest in the main shopping area of Grafton Street.

On 27 February 2021, violent clashes between protesters and the Garda Síochána erupted during an anti-lockdown protest near St Stephen's Green in Dublin. Three Gardaí were injured and 23 people were arrested in the aftermath of the protest. The Taoiseach Micheál Martin condemned the demonstration as "an unacceptable risk to both the public and Gardaí". A non-violent anti-lockdown protest with approximately 450 people in attendance took place on 6 March in Cork. The event was organised by The People's Convention. Six people were arrested on the day of the protest.

=== Italy ===
Since the month of March 2020, many people started protesting over COVID-19 and the rules imposed by the Italian government.

=== Netherlands ===
On 24 January 2021, violent protests erupted as a reaction to the Dutch government decision to impose a curfew as a means to curb the spread of the COVID-19. The curfew, imposed between 9 PM to 4:30 AM, was the first of its kind to be enacted in the country since the Second World War. Protests took place in most major cities, including Amsterdam and Eindhoven. Police made hundreds of arrests and issued thousands of fines. The Dutch Police Association described the riots at the worst violence in Netherlands in the last 40 years. The protests have been described as being composed of mostly young men.

An opinion poll by public broadcaster NOS indicated that the curfew was supported by seven out of 10 Dutch respondents (although the amounts of respondents is unknown), with just 18% of the population opposing it. An online poll with over 28.000 respondents, done by Radio NPO1, a Dutch state radio station, showed that 89% of Dutch people wanted the curfew to be removed.

After the Netherlands went into a partial lockdown on 12 November 2021 due to a sharp rise in COVID-19 cases, another series of protests and riots occurred over such measures. Rioting was especially concentrated in Rotterdam, where police fired warning shots at rioters, injuring at least two.

=== Poland ===
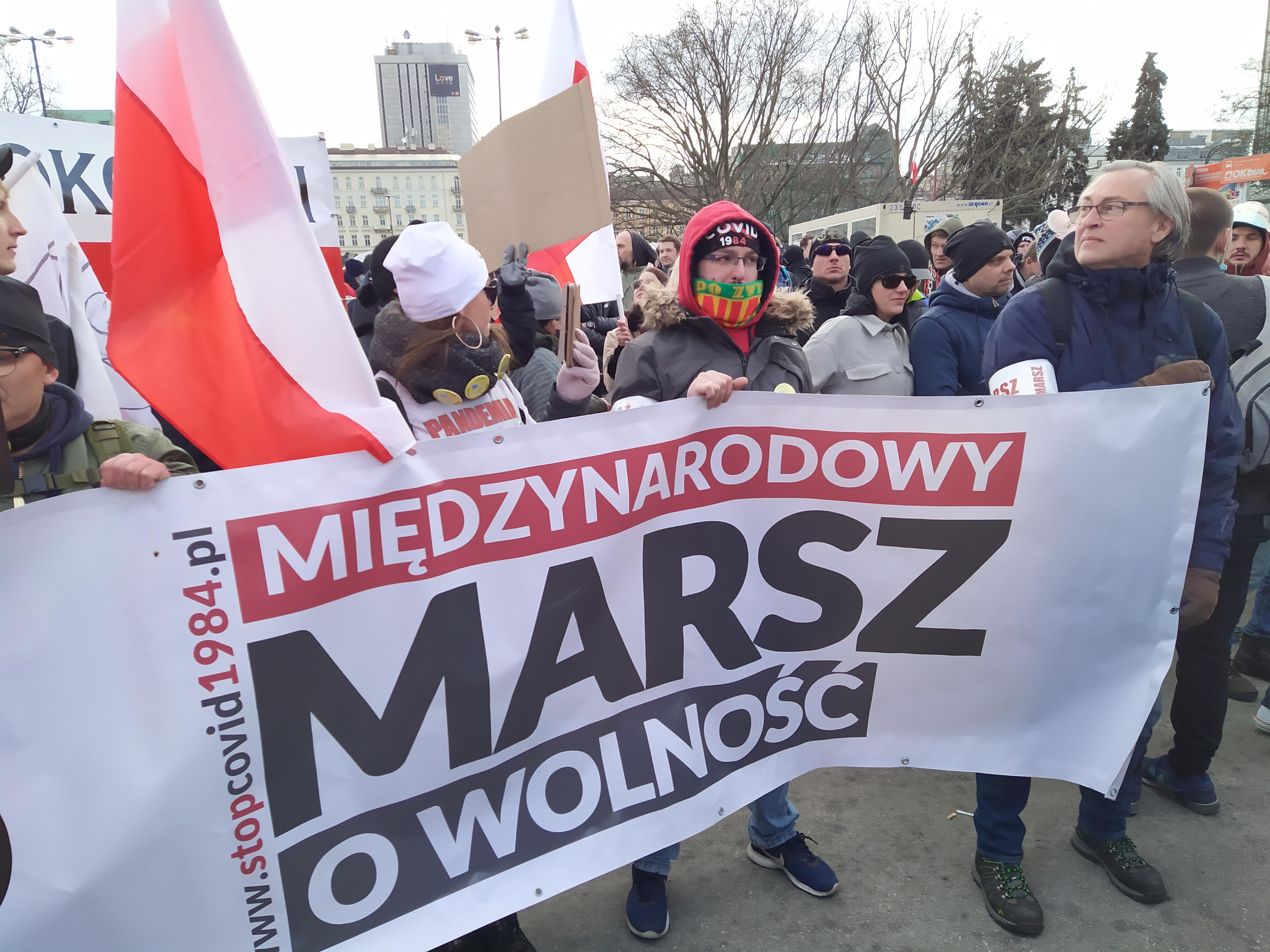
Protest against anti-pandemic measures in Warsaw

Hundreds of protesters gathered in the Polish border town of Zgorzelec to protest the lockdown regulations, the protest was staged specifically on the foot bridge connecting Zgorzelec and the German town of Görlitz as many lived in Poland but worked in Germany. Many protested the inability to cross the borders of the countries as they lived in a different country from where they worked, and similar protests were seen in border towns along the German–Polish border and the Czech–Polish border. Freedom march (Marsz Wolności) happens every month, for example in Wrocław.

=== Russia ===
Security forces broke up a crowd of about 2,000 individuals protesting against the lockdown in Vladikavkaz, North Ossetia–Alania, with some detained and the believed organizer arrested prior to the event. Some protesters at the event used their social media to post videos about their demands against the lockdown, with one stating; "Today, under the pretext of the coronavirus, which doesn't exist, people are driven into slavery, they are trying to establish total control over us all."

=== Serbia ===
On 7 July 2020, a riot began in Belgrade after the government's announcement of a curfew for the weekend. Protests began because of the government's continuous change in handling COVID-19 policy and alleged hiding of the number of COVID-19 cases in the country.

=== Slovakia ===
In late 2020 and during 2021, several anti-COVID-restriction protests were held also in Slovakia, mainly in the capital, Bratislava and also Košice. Many people are starting to disobey the rules: they go to bars even though they are not vaccinated, they don't wear FFP2 mask but only textile mask. There were even incidents of people without masks coming to a grocery store. These customers were then beaten by the police as they refused to put on their mask.

=== Slovenia ===
During the pandemic, protests emerged throughout the country. Participants argued that the government at the time was tackling the pandemic poorly, citing forced vaccination and discrimination against those who had not been vaccinated using measures which overly restricted fundamental rights. Protestors also accused the government of destroying the rule of law; having policies against political and ideological opponents; xenophobia and discrimination against immigrants; and corruption (in terms of contracts for medical equipment). In spite of the protests, early 2020 saw no positive outcomes for those involved, with the Slovenian Constitutional Court ruling that two separate government measures restricting freedom of movement were indeed constitutional.

In 2021, the Slovenian government issued new laws that restricted protests to a maximum of 10 people. The Slovenian Constitutional Court would delay this legislation until they could conduct a full review of its legality. The court would rule that the measures were too strict on freedom of expression.

=== Spain ===
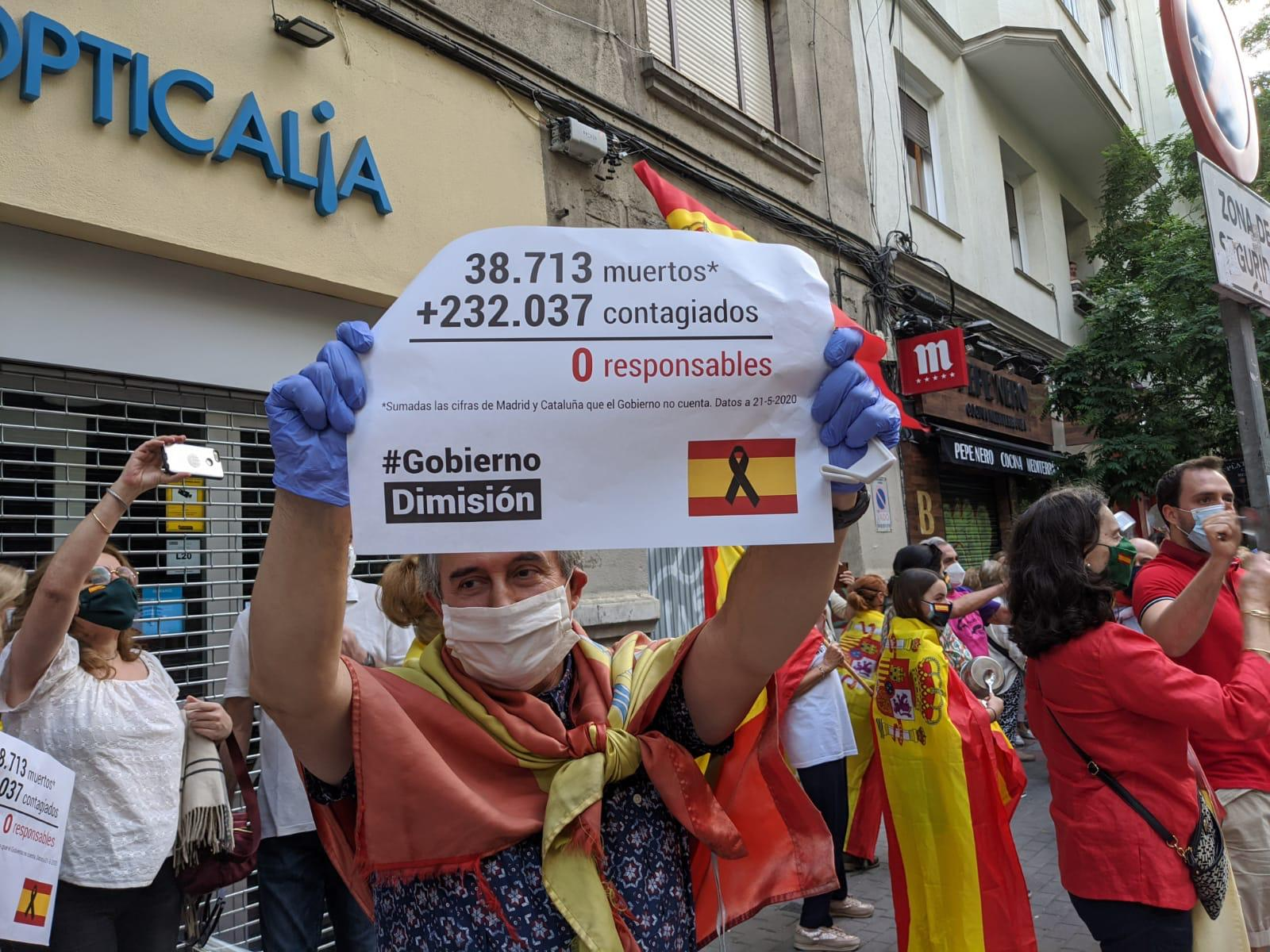
Protest in Spain on 26 May 2020

Thousands of people, mostly supporters of the right-wing party Vox, attended protests in Madrid and the country's regional capitals over the lockdown and its impact on the Spanish economy. The protesters drove in convoys to adhere to social distancing, with the Madrid protest led by a bus containing Vox leader Santiago Abascal. Abascal called for the national government of Pedro Sánchez to resign over its handling of the virus.

On 20 September 2020, thousands of people went out in protest throughout the Community of Madrid demanding the resignation of the regional government of Isabel Díaz Ayuso, after the latter had announced two days earlier a partial lockdown affecting 850,000 people living in the region's poorest areas which was dubbed as "segregationist" and fostering "stigmatisation, exclusion and territorial discrimination". The protests came amid growing criticism of Ayuso's handling of the virus as "ineffective" and of her coalition government having "floundered" in its attempt to antagonize with Sánchez's government, as the region became the most heavily hit area in all of Europe in the second wave of the pandemic with many neighborhoods being near or above 1,000 cases per 100,000 people.

=== Sweden ===
On 6 March 2021, an estimate of 300-500 people gathered at Medborgarplatsen in Stockholm to protest against COVID-19 measures. The Swedish police dispersed hundreds of protesters and stated that six of their officers had been injured in the process, with one needing to be hospitalized.

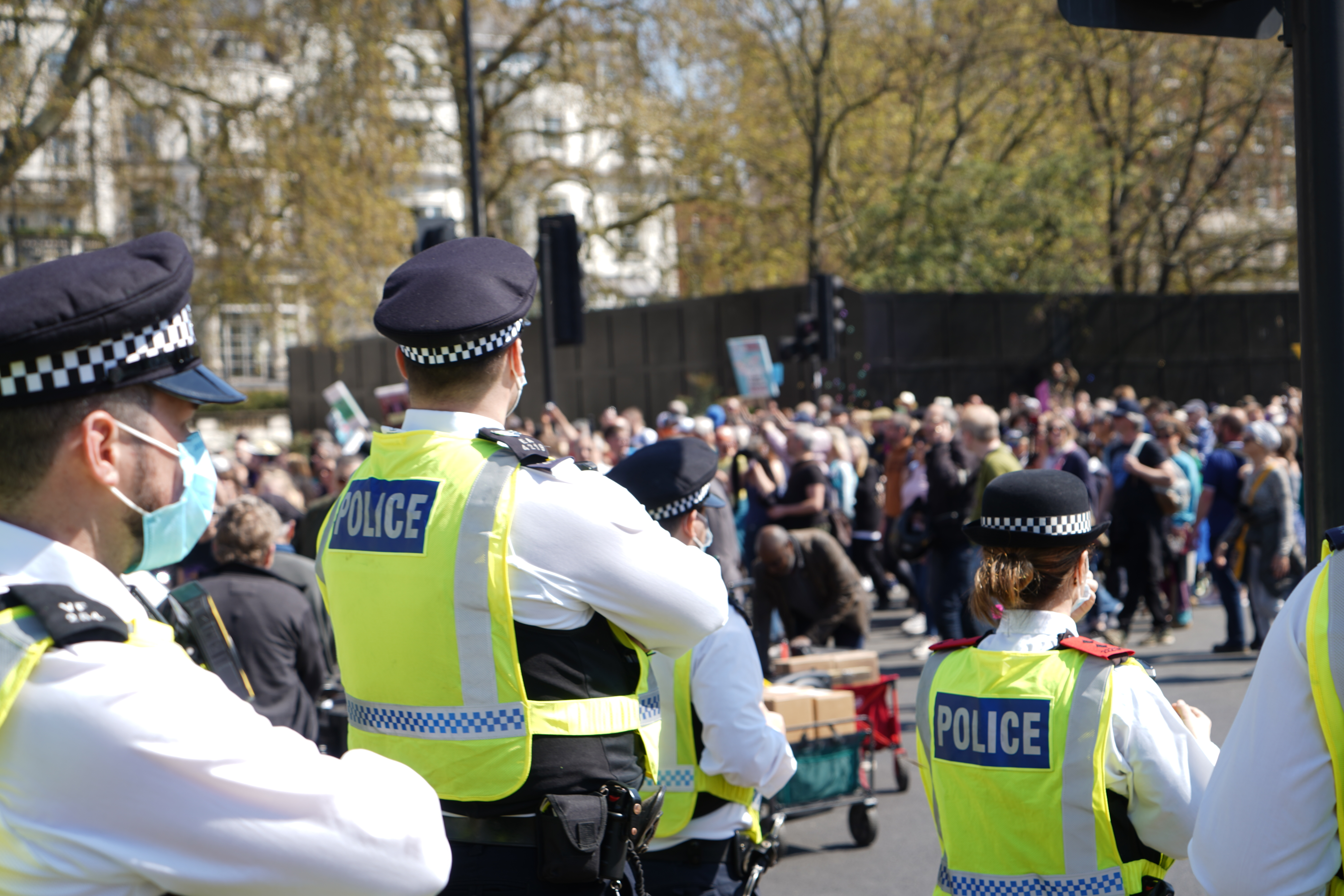
Anti-lockdown protest march in London, April 2021

=== Switzerland ===
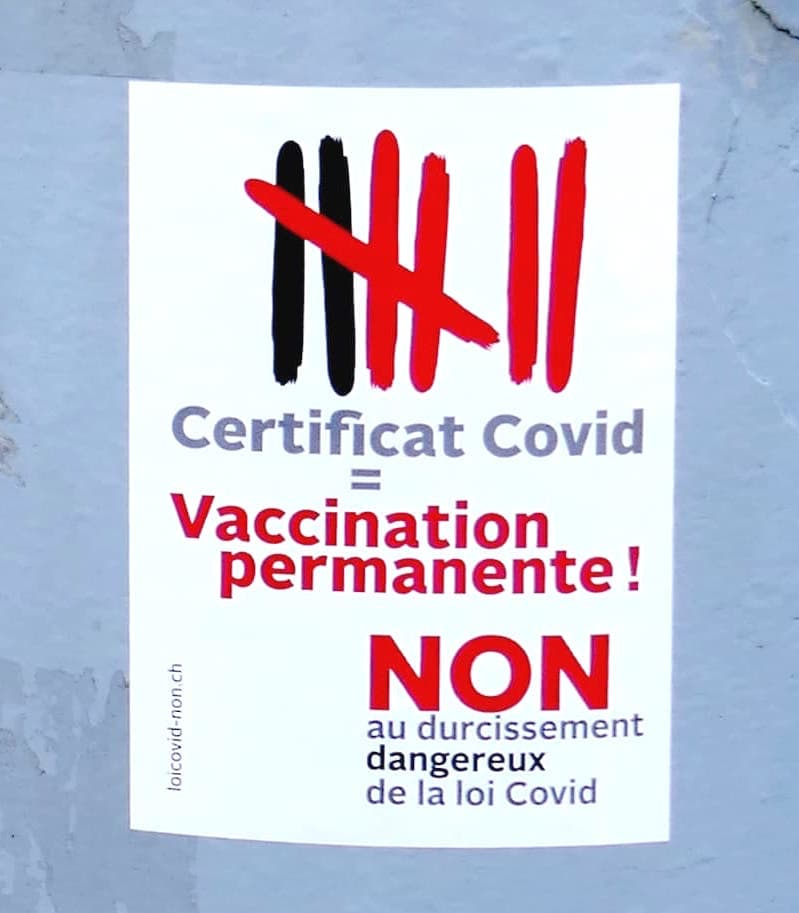
Opposition to the Covid certificate in Switzerland, sticker at Geneva.

On June 11, 2020, the member of the Zurich Cantonal Council Urs Hahn was expelled from his party, the Greens, for opposing the thesis of the seriousness of the pandemic. On September 12, 2020, a demonstration against masks, containment measures or the supposed lies of the media brings together a thousand people in Geneva at the Place des Nations, in front of the United Nations. The three major opposition figures coronasceptics in French-speaking Switzerland are the web videographers Chloé Frammery, Ema Krusi and Christian Tal Schaller. Coronasceptics and opponents of measures to combat the spread of Covid-19 are increasingly occupying the Federal Office of Police (Fedpol). Threats against federal officials are on the rise.

In January 2021, the national councilor UDC Yves Nidegger opposed the “health dictatorship”. In Liestal, 8000 people demonstrate on March 20, 2021, against the anti-Covid measures in force while in Bern the police stop a demonstration for the same causes. Following these demonstrations, the #NoLiestal movement is rising on digital networks to denounce and counter the agglomeration initiatives of coronasceptics in Switzerland.

=== Ukraine ===
On 14–20 February, protests against the placement of evacuated Ukrainian citizens (suspected of having coronavirus disease 2019) from the city of Wuhan (PRC) in Ukraine took place in Novi Sanzhary.

In the summer and autumn of 2021, actions against obligatory vaccination against COVID-19 and restrictions for unvaccinated persons took place in various cities of Ukraine. In particular, on 27 July the "procession" against vaccination was organized by the Moscow Patriarchate and on November 3 the protesters blocked the streets in Kyiv

=== United Kingdom ===
The first protests against the national mandatory lockdown in the United Kingdom took place in April 2020, extending into the following month before abating as lockdown restrictions were slowly eased. As local area lockdown measures were reintroduced towards the end of summer, followed by stricter national lockdown measures, anti-lockdown protests resurged across the country beginning in September 2020. More than 55 protesters have been arrested in these events as of October 2020. Some protesters have claimed that COVID-19 is a hoax, and many refused to wear masks or practice social distancing. Protests have occurred in Shrewsbury, Glastonbury, London, Manchester, Glasgow, Belfast, Hove, Birmingham, Liverpool, as well as a few other cities.

Protests over restrictions overlapped with anti-vaccine protests following the start of the UK's COVID-19 vaccination programme in December 2020. On the weekend of 24–25 July 2021, protests broke out again in several major cities in the United Kingdom including London, Leeds, Manchester and Birmingham due to people opposing vaccines and proposed COVID passports.

== North America ==
=== Canada ===
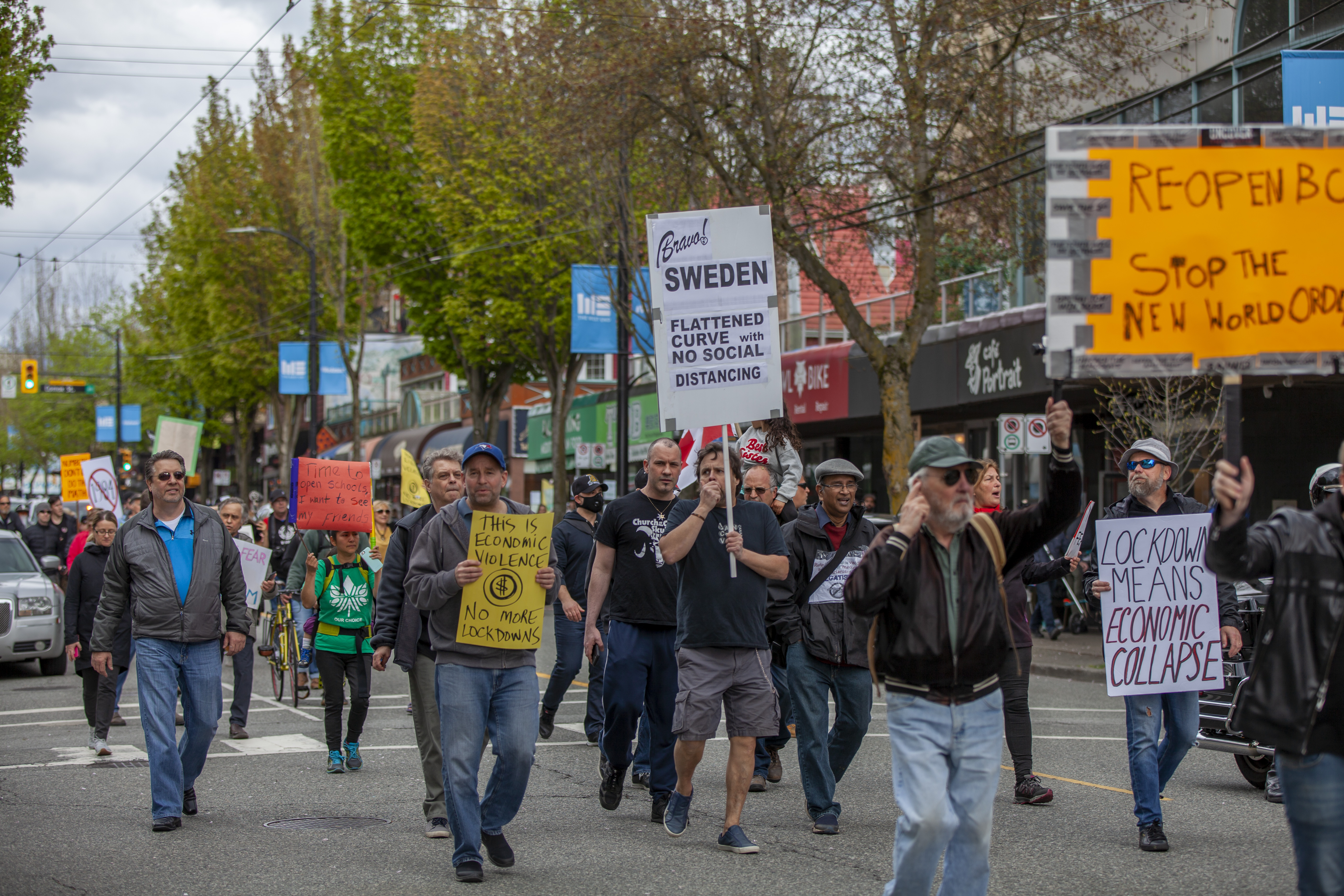
Anti-lockdown protest in Vancouver, British Columbia, on 26 April 2020

In Canada, protests began on 19 April 2020 in Vancouver. Protests also occurred in Toronto, Edmonton and Ottawa.

On 21 April 2020 it was reported that prisoners at the Saskatchewan Penitentiary had been protesting against restrictions placed upon them in response to COVID-19, like being kept in their cells for 20 hours a day.

On 15 January 2021, Roman Baber, Member of Provincial Parliament for the Toronto riding of York Centre, was removed from the caucus of the governing Progressive Conservative Party of Ontario after publishing an open letter to Premier Doug Ford criticizing Ontario's lockdown restrictions. Baber continued his anti-lockdown advocacy as an independent member of the legislative opposition.

On 1 September 2021, thousands of people protested COVID-19 vaccine policies and mask mandates outside of Vancouver City Hall.

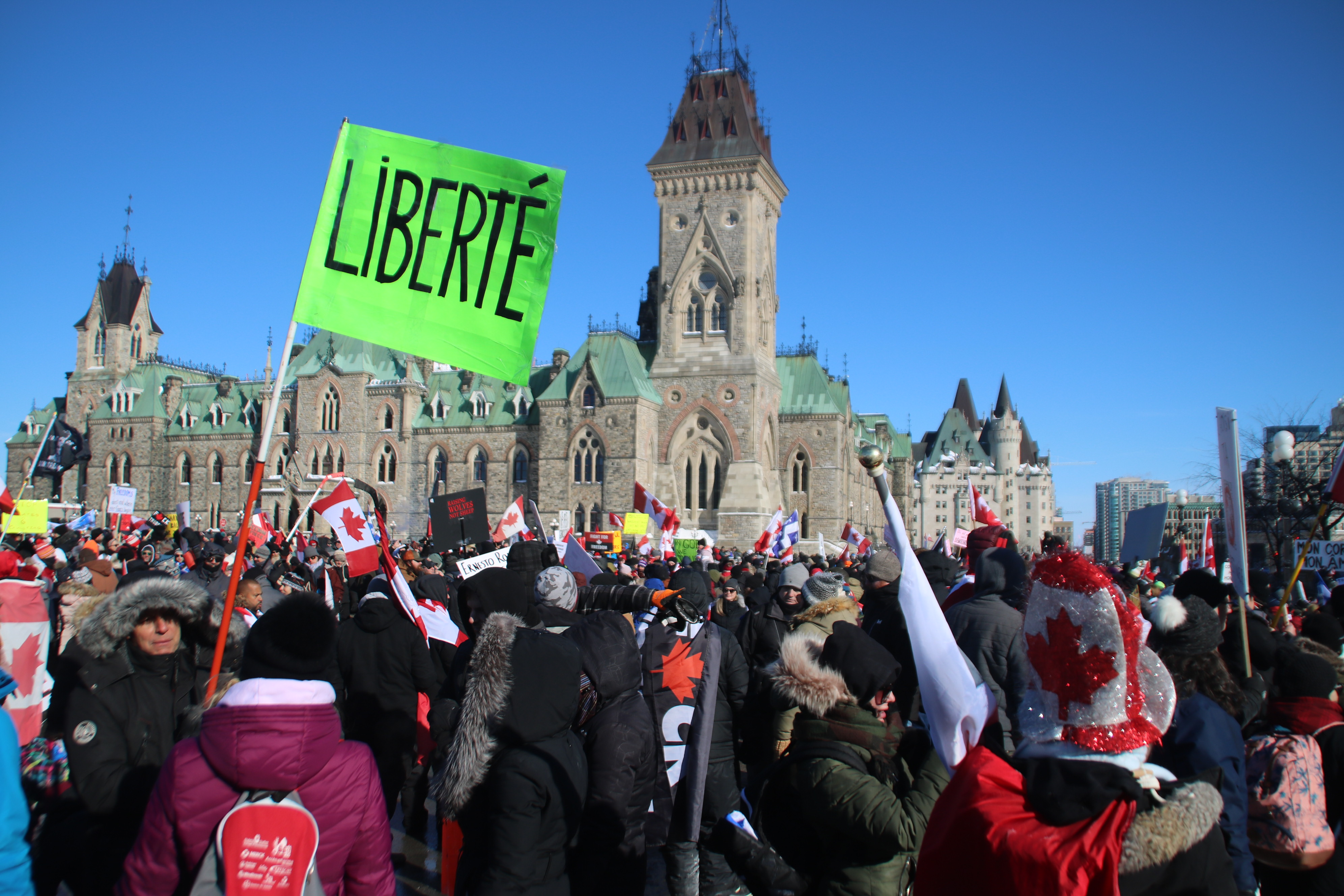
Anti-mandate protest in Ottawa, Canada's capital city, on 1 February 2022

In January 2022, Freedom Convoy 2022 began. Prime Minister Justin Trudeau invoked the Emergencies Act for the first time to quell the unrest from the occupation and harassment of Ottawa and its citizens by hundreds of trucks, their drivers and thousands of unruly protesters.

==== Alberta ====
A group calling itself "Walk for Freedom" has been organizing anti-mask protests since at least April 2020. Concerns were raised when several hundred protestors took part in a 20 February 2021 freedom convoy and Jericho Torch March at the Legislature organized by the "Walk for Freedom Alberta" and the "Freedom Unity Alliance". Posters advertising the rally included an image of white nationalists marching through Charlottesville with Tiki torches in the 2017 US Unite the Right rally. The group of hundreds of unmasked anti-lockdown protestors, carrying a Walk for Freedom banner included COVID-19 deniers. Others were supporters of a pastor who was arrested for repeatedly refusing to comply to public health regulations, such as capping attendance, physical distancing and mask-wearing. The Justice Centre for Constitutional Freedoms (JCCF), representing the pastor, had launched a legal charter challenge against the Alberta government. The Mayor of Edmonton said that the rally organizers were from outside Edmonton and that they "may be associated with known hate groups. Edmonton unequivocally condemns racism, misogyny and other forms of hate—such speech is not welcome in our community."

=== Cuba ===
A series of protests began on 11 July 2021, triggered by the shortage of food and medicine and the government's response to the resurgent COVID-19 pandemic in Cuba.

=== Mexico ===
On 29 April, police in Yajalón, Chiapas, southern Mexico, opened fire on people who were protesting against a checkpoint that left their community isolated. Residents of neighbouring Tumbalá complained that the checkpoint made it impossible for them to access governmental and banking services and that it seemed to be related to a belief that Tumbalá had a high rate of coronavirus infection. Checkpoints have been installed in about 20% of Mexico's municipalities, which the federal government has declared illegal.

Hundreds of Mexicans participated in caravans on 30 May demanding the resignation of President Andrés Manuel López Obrador because of his handling of the COVID-19 pandemic in Mexico and the economy. The caravans, which took place in about a dozen cities across the country, consisted largely of luxury cars.

Violence broke out on 4 June during demonstrations in Guadalajara, Jalisco to demand justice after the death of Giovanni López in the town of Ixtlahuacán de los Membrillos. López, a 30-year-old mason, had been arrested on 4 May for not wearing a facemask during a lockdown and died the next day while in police custody.

=== United States ===
The United States' national response began in early January, originating with actions by the Centers for Disease Control (CDC) and the White House. The first U.S. case of COVID-19 was recorded on 19 January 2020. In the United States, the response was determined by state and local officials in coordination with the CDC and federal officials. On 9 February, governors were briefed by the White House Coronavirus Task Force. Beginning in mid-March, various social distancing measures to limit spread of the virus were undertaken by state governors and in some cases counties or cities. Actions taken included stay-at-home orders ("quarantine"), school and business closures, and limitation on the size of gatherings. On 19 March 2020, President Donald Trump, and Vice President Mike Pence met (via teleconference) with governors of most states to continue coordination and to assist states with their responses. FEMA was brought into the effort around this time. By 7 April 42 states had lockdown orders in place. The shutdowns had serious economic effects, including a steep rise in unemployment due to the shutdown of stores and workplaces. By 15 April protests and demonstrations had broken out in some states, demanding that the area be "re-opened" for normal business and personal activity. By 1 May there had been demonstrations in more than half of the states, and many governors began to take steps to lift the restrictions.

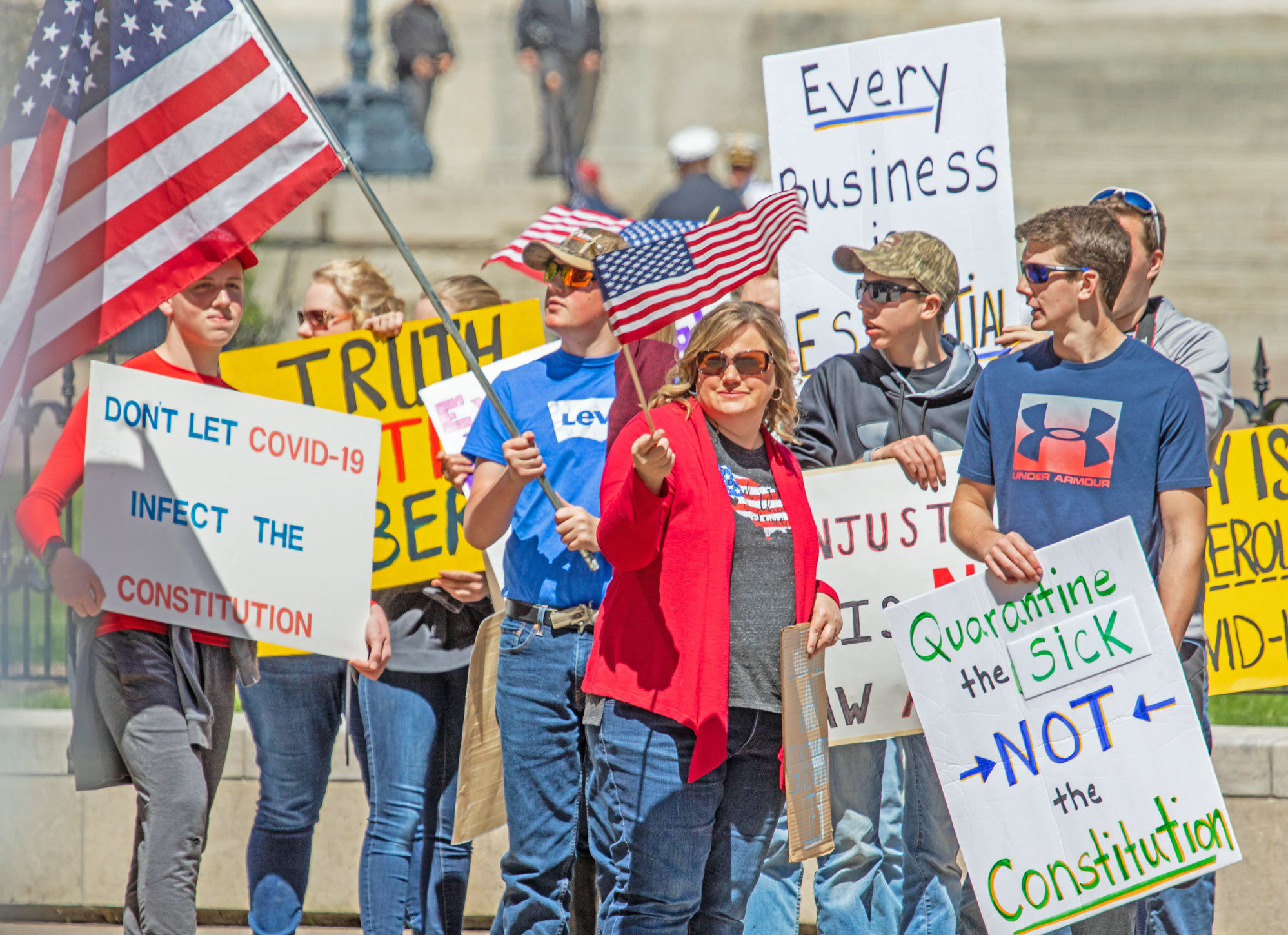
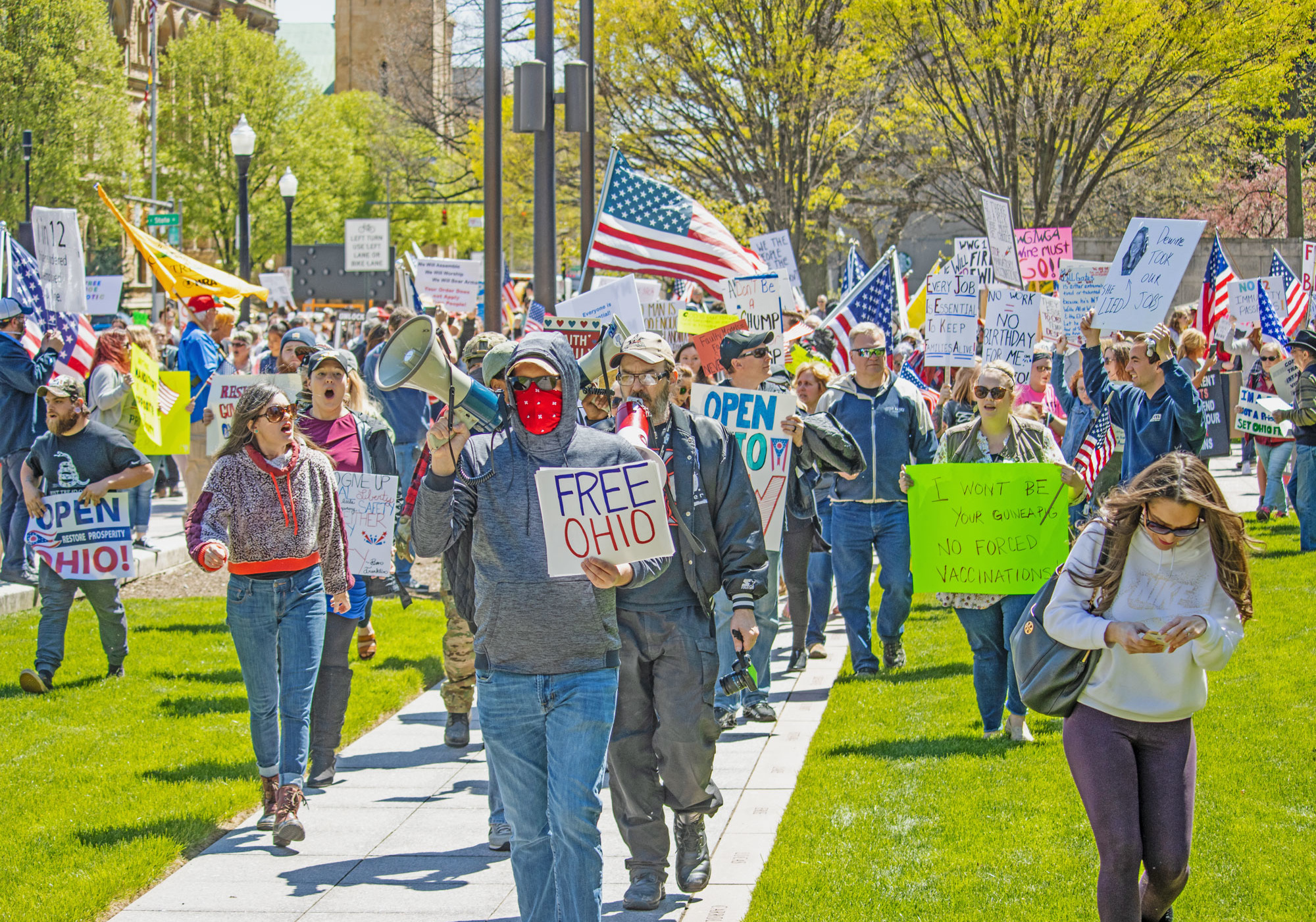
Several hundred anti-lockdown protesters rallied at the Ohio Statehouse on 20 April.

One of the first protests was in Michigan on 15 April 2020, organized by conservative groups which also encouraged groups in other states to copy their wording and templates. Protesters in numerous other states said they were inspired by Michigan, and they used Michigan's material on their own websites, Facebook groups, and Reddit pages to promote their protests. Subsequent protests were organized by Republican activists or party organizations, Tea Party activists, armed militia movement supporters, guns-rights activists, and "anti-vaccination" advocates.

Protesters, many without face masks, opposed the shelter-in-place orders in their states for various reasons. Many said they wanted businesses reopened so they could go back to work. Many others displayed pro-Trump banners, signs, and MAGA hats. Still others insisted the lockdowns were a violation of their constitutional rights. One militia leader told a reporter, "Re-open my state or we will re-open it ourselves." An opinion article in The New York Times, and an article in The Washington Post claimed that the anger driving the protests was "both real and manufactured", blaming conservative groups for engaging in astroturfing via centralized organization backed by anonymous donors.

President Trump originally issued guidelines for how to phase out restrictions, saying that governors would decide how to reopen their own states and suggesting a cautious three-phase approach. However, the next day he reacted to the protests against social restrictions by encouraging the protests. Governor Jay Inslee (D-WA) accused Trump of "fomenting domestic rebellion" and said Trump's call to ignore his own team's guidelines was "schizophrenic".

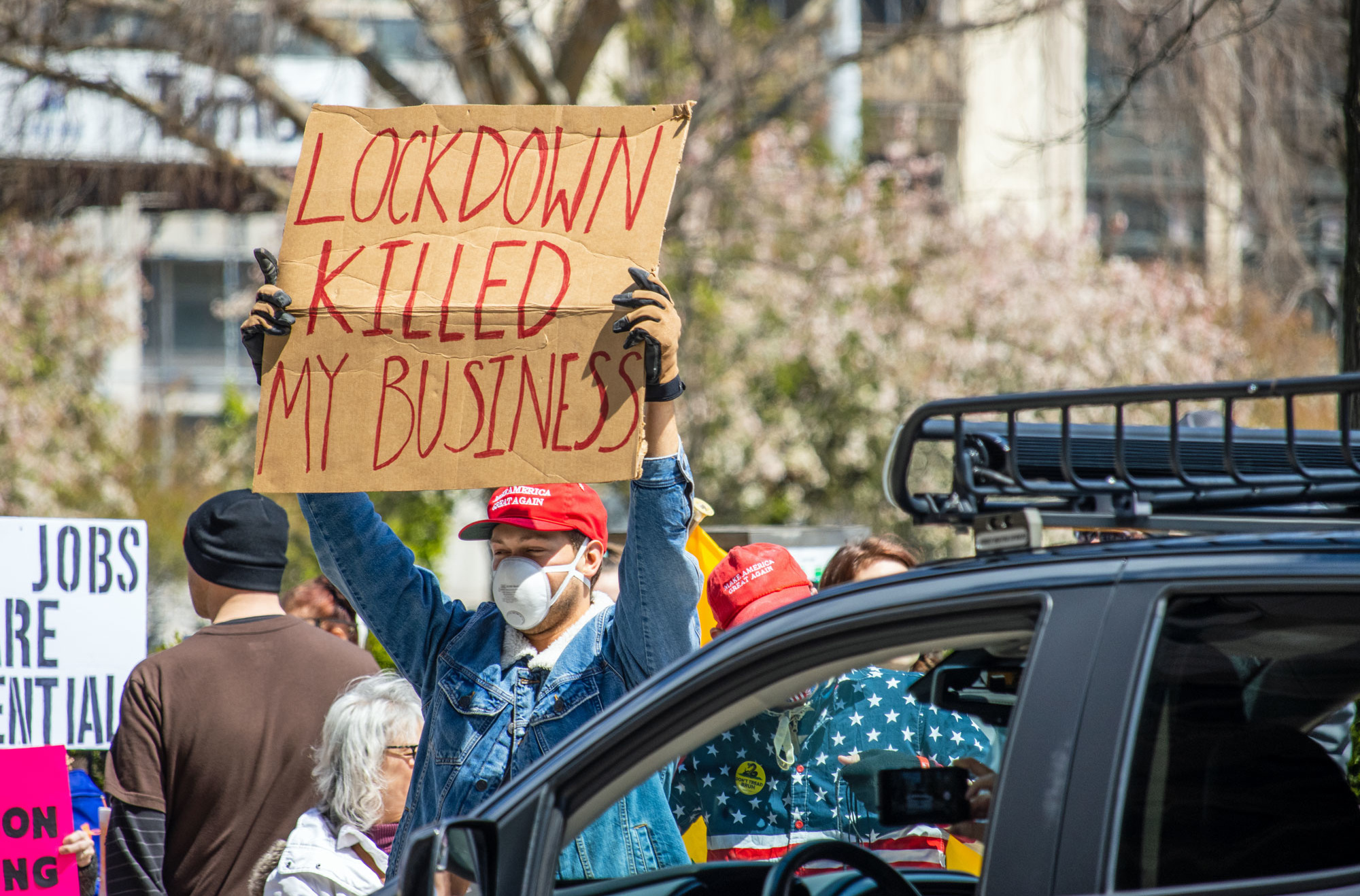
An anti-lockdown protester in April 2020

Facebook announced that it would block events and messages from anti-quarantine protest groups "when gatherings do not follow the health parameters established by the government and are therefore unlawful".

In California, Libertarian Party chapters in Santa Clara and San Francisco counties condemned lockdown measures in the state with a resolution stating in part that, "these government impositions have already lasted for longer than could be justified by the purpose for which they were allegedly necessary, constituting a sort of "mission creep" that could potentially keep them in place with no definite end, and with economic and social damage continuing to accumulate and becoming more severe." Such responses were compared to the Anti-Mask League of San Francisco movement that was seen during the 1918 Spanish flu pandemic, where the efficacy of masks was debated during the second wave of flu in the city. The Anti-Mask League saw the medical advice on masks as unconstitutional, and contrary to the principles of a free society.

Cell phone data from digital-contact tracing software, captured from opt-in cellphone apps and the Firm VoteMap, then provided to The Guardian (publication) by progressive campaign group the Committee to Protect Medicare, suggests that cell phones present at anti-lockdown protests in Colorado, Florida, Illinois, Michigan and North Carolina traveled long distances after leaving the protests. Dr. Rob Davidson, executive director of the Committee to Protect Medicare, said that although “it's hard to draw a straight line between devices, individuals at these protests, and cases”, the data suggests that the protests may be epidemiologically significant events." and that "The behavior we’re seeing at protests carries a high risk of infection."

On 30 January 2021, dozens of "SCAMDEMIC" protesters blocked the entrance to the vaccination center at Dodger Stadium in Los Angeles.

== Oceania ==
=== American Samoa ===
In July 2020, several people protested against the spending of COVID-19 funds in American Samoa.

=== Australia ===
Throughout 2020 and 2021, numerous illegal protests of widely varying sizes against COVID-19 lockdown restrictions and the Australian Federal Government's vaccination programme were held in several state capitals including Adelaide, Brisbane, Melbourne, Perth and Sydney. Police responded to some of the protests by arresting demonstrators and issuing fines.

In Melbourne, Victoria, from 20 to 24 September 2021, a series of protests occurred in the city's CBD. Protesters were predominantly tradesmen who were acting against lockdowns, the closure of the construction industry and vaccine mandates. It is believed that several protesters were "fake tradies" who could be described as "professional protesters". Police responded with rubber bullets, batons and tear gas. Various media outlets were critical of the police's heavy-handed response to the protesters and bystander civilians.

The first major legal protest occurred in early 2022 in Canberra, Australian Capital Territory, which is also the most highly vaccinated jurisdiction in Australia. A "Convoy to Canberra", consisting of thousands of protesters in trailers, trucks, cars and campervans made their way in the national capital in January. On 12 February, around 10,000 protesters converged on Parliament House and Old Parliament House, and Lifeline Canberra suspended its major fund-raising event due to safety concerns for customers.

=== Christmas Island ===
Detainees at the Christmas Island Detention Centre rioted and set fire to buildings in a protest against the conditions of the detention centre.

=== Fiji ===
In June 2021, following lockdowns in Fiji, locals protested across the country for more government support.

=== French Polynesia ===
In October 2021, several protests against a proposed law mandating COVID-19 vaccines were held throughout French Polynesia including Papeete in Tahiti and Hiva Oa in the Marquesas Islands. Notable groups and individuals involved included the "Don't Touch my Family" group, the pro-independence party Tavini Huiraatira, and retired Dr. Jean-Paul Theron, who was locked in a dispute with health authorities over his methods of treating COVID-19 patients. The proposed law requires anyone working in healthcare or with the public to get inoculated or be fined $US1,700. In response to strong opposition from anti-vaccination protesters, unions, and employers, President Édouard Fritch announced that the new law would be delayed until 23 December.

=== Guam ===
Members of the Guam Freedom Coalition protested vaccine mandates in Guam on 30 October 2021.

=== New Caledonia ===
An estimate of 1,000 people staged a protest in Nouméa against government policies regarding the pandemic, such as the introduction of health passes and vaccine mandates. The protest occurred a day after outdoor gatherings in New Caledonia were limited to 30 people, however police decided not to intervene due to the presence of children.

=== New Zealand ===
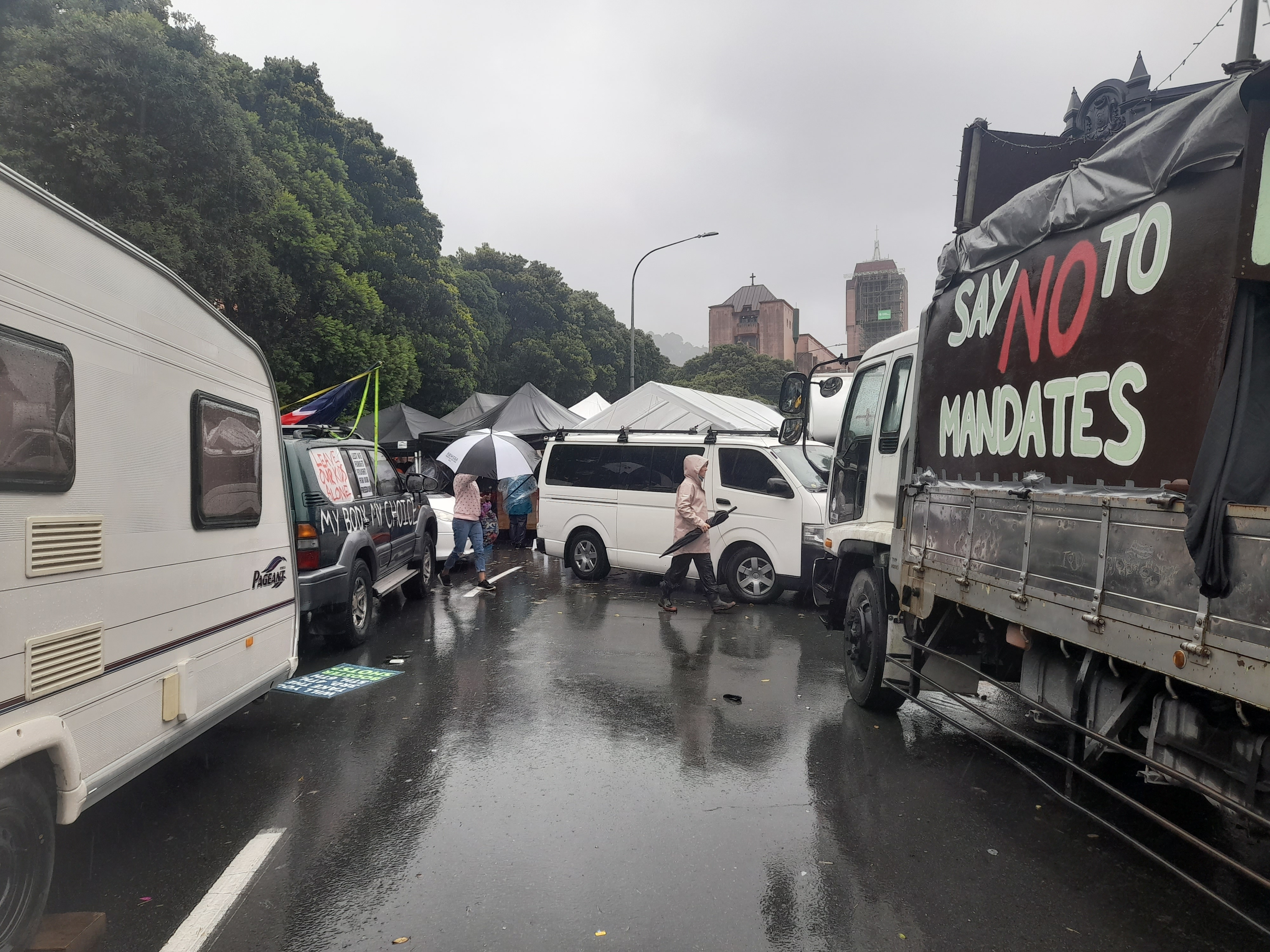
Protesters blocking a street at the Convoy 2022 NZ protest in Wellington

Between August and October 2021, several protests were held across New Zealand to protest official lockdown measures, vaccination, and spread disinformation about the COVID-19 pandemic. Key groups and individuals that were involved in these protests included FACTS NZ, Kotahitanga Movement Aotearoa, the NZ Liberty Movement and Jami-Lee Ross and Billy Te Kahika's Advance New Zealand party.

In January 2021, Te Kahika led a "freedom rally" outside the New Zealand Parliament; protestors opposed lockdown policies, while expressing support for US President Donald Trump and QAnon. Following the reinstatement of lockdown restrictions in mid–August 2021 in response to a Delta variant community outbreak, anti-lockdown protests were staged in Auckland, Tauranga, Nelson, and Christchurch. Key participants included Te Kahika and far-right activist Kyle Champman. In February 2022, Convoy 2022 New Zealand gathered outside parliament buildings and blocked streets in Wellington.

=== Papua New Guinea ===
During the pandemic, attacks on health workers and vaccination teams in Papua New Guinea have occurred multiple times. Protests were banned nationwide due to the pandemic, however they still occurred across the country, particularly in the capital, Port Moresby, as well as in Lae.

=== Samoa ===
On 8 May 2020, around 100 people protested new laws regarding COVID-19 in Samoa. On 23 June 2022, more than 30 people protested vaccine mandates in Samoa.

=== Solomon Islands ===
The 2021 Solomon Islands unrest was partially caused by government mishandling of the pandemic.

=== Vanuatu ===
The Government of Vanuatu criticised a planned protest regarding COVID-19 involving church and youth groups. The protesters claimed that the Police Commissioner had given them permission to protest, however the Deputy Prime Minister Ishmael Kalsakau said it could not go ahead as it was politically motivated. Protestors also claimed that at least two MPs (namely Andrew Napuat and John Salong) supported the protest.

== South America ==
=== Argentina ===
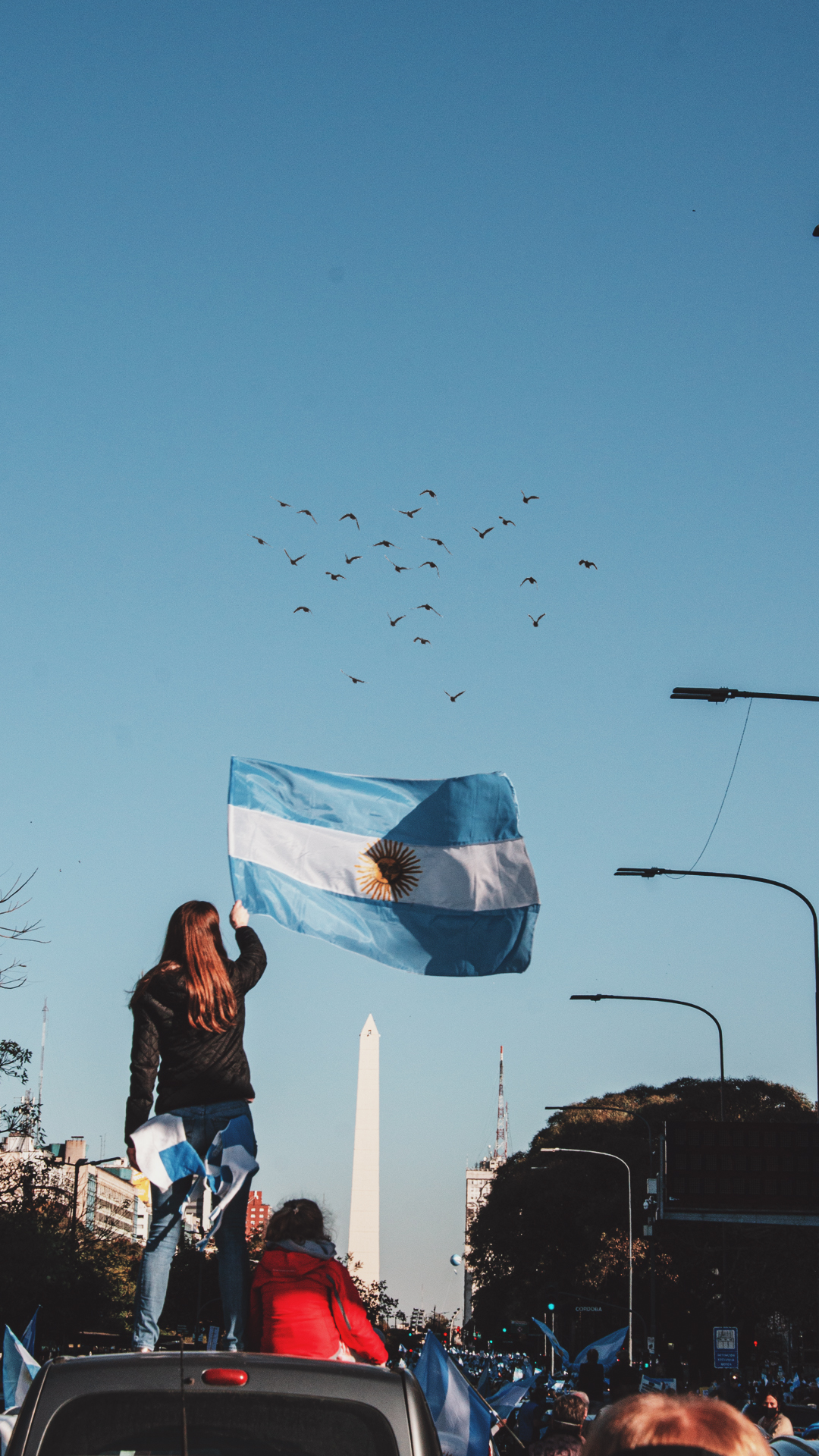
The 17A protests on 17 August 2020

On 25 May, during the Anniversary of the First National Government, protests erupted all over the country, but predominantly in Buenos Aires and Cordoba. The protest consisted mostly of small business owners demanding the local and national governments to be allowed to work, under a sanitary protocol. At this point, the stay-at-home order had been in place nationwide for 65 days.

On 20 June, which is the country's National Flag Day, the size of the protests had grown immensely compared to the previous ones held in late May. While business owners and workers were still calling for more workplaces to be allowed to operate, the government's attempt to expropriate Vicentín, a soy and wheat manufacturer and one of the largest exporting firms in the country, also sparked outrage and motivated protests in many provinces where agriculture plays a big role in their local economy, particularly in the Santa Fe Province, where this business is located. Due to the huge backlash, president Alberto Fernandez has decided to step down and not take over the company. Protests also took place in the city centre of most cities and at the gates of the presidential residence. While the lockdown had been lifted in most provinces and municipalities, it was still enforced in Greater Buenos Aires, which represents around 60% of the Argentine economy. On this day, the stay-at-home order had been in place for 90 days, making it the longest mandatory quarantine in response to the COVID-19 pandemic.

On 9 July, the country's Independence Day, protests flared up once again. In addition to workers and entrepreneurs asking to be allowed to work, many were angered by the fact that Lazaro Baez, who is serving jail time for money laundering and stealing from taxpayers' money and is associated with much of the government staff, could be eligible for parole. This incident, and the murder of Fabián Gutiérrez, who was ex-president Cristina Fernandez de Kirchner's secretary while she was in office, which many opposition affiliates believe was orchestrated by the administration and covered up as a "crime of passion" by two unknown men, also caused large outrage in some sectors of the population. This day marked 109 days since the lockdown was put in place in the Greater Buenos Aires area.

On 1 August, many opponents of Alberto Fernandez's government, and of Kirchnerism in general, took to the streets to rally against the judicial reform proposed by the administration. Many believe this is a way to absolve vice president Cristina Fernandez de Kirchner from her ongoing trials, and also a way to give the governing political party control over the judicial branch of government, all disguised under the promise that this reform will make judges and trials fairer and less biased to certain ideologies or political parties. While the lockdown has not been completely lifted in Buenos Aires, many activities and businesses are now allowed to take place again since mid-July, and a re-opening scheme with various stages has been designed and put in place, although with no strict dates. However, many companies, such as restaurants or bars for instance, still cannot open and many business owners are uncertain of how much more they can endure with their doors closed.

On 17 August, the General José de San Martín Memorial Day, a public holiday which commemorates Argentine liberator and army general José de San Martín, protesters gathered once again on the city centres of the main Argentine cities for the same reasons as the previous one, 16 days prior. This manifestation was backed by many political figures from the Juntos por el Cambio, Frente Despertar, Fuerza Unidaria Argentina, opposition forces, near liberal, libertarian and survivalist groups. Some, however, have decided to not publicly support the protests, most notably Horacio Rodríguez Larreta, mayor of Buenos Aires.

=== Brazil ===
==== 2020 ====
On 18 March, Brazilians in São Paulo and Rio de Janeiro protested Jair Bolsonaro's handling of the pandemic by banging pots and pans on their balconies and shouting "Bolsonaro out!"

On 19 April, Brazil's Armed Forces Day, Bolsonaro gathered with about 600 protesters in front of the Army's headquarters in Brasilia to demand a "military intervention" into the handling of the coronavirus situation. Smaller protests calling for governors to resign occurred the previous day in Rio de Janeiro, São Paulo and Brasilia.

==== 2021 ====
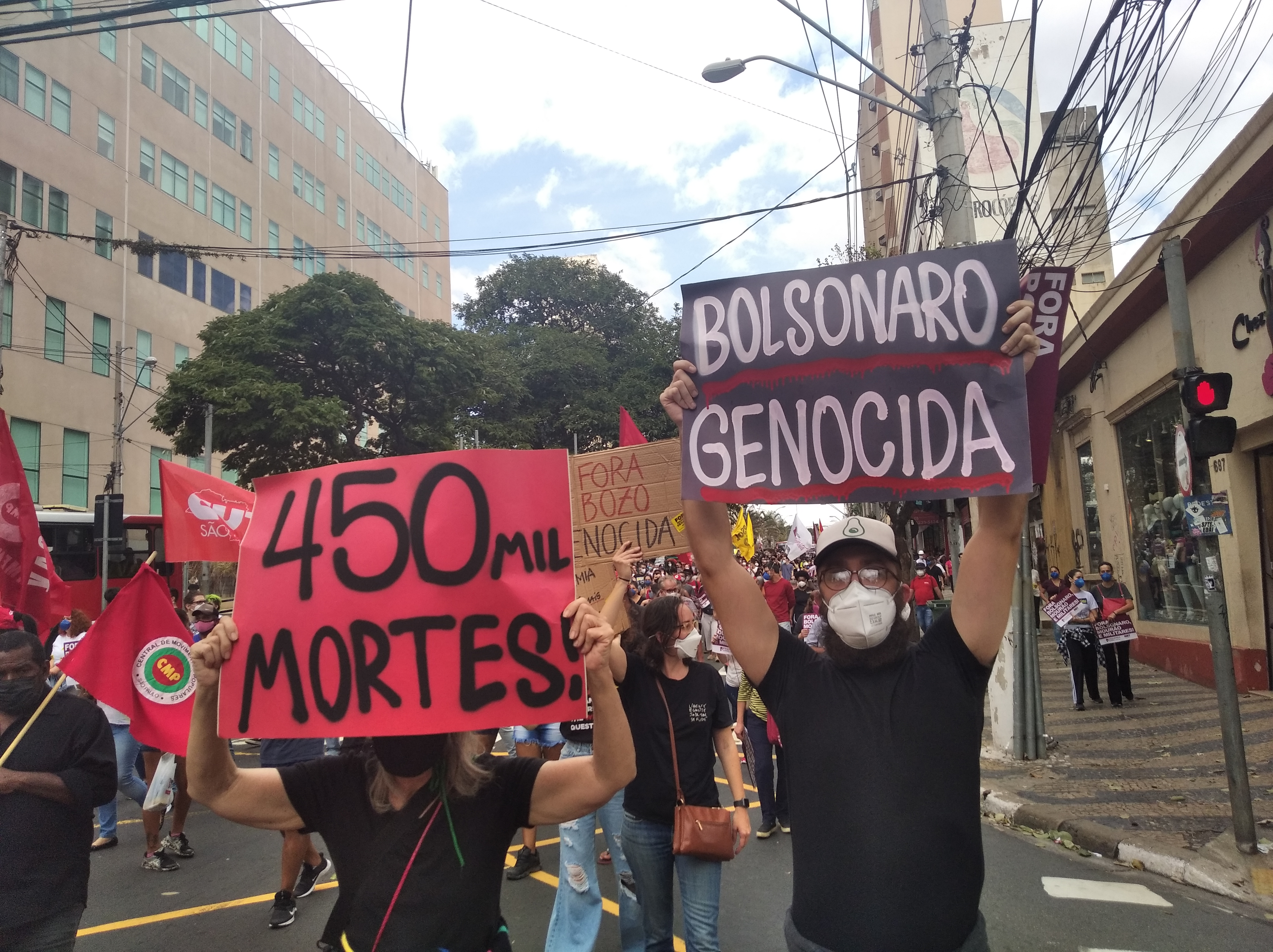
Protest against the government of President Bolsonaro in Campinas on 29 May 2021

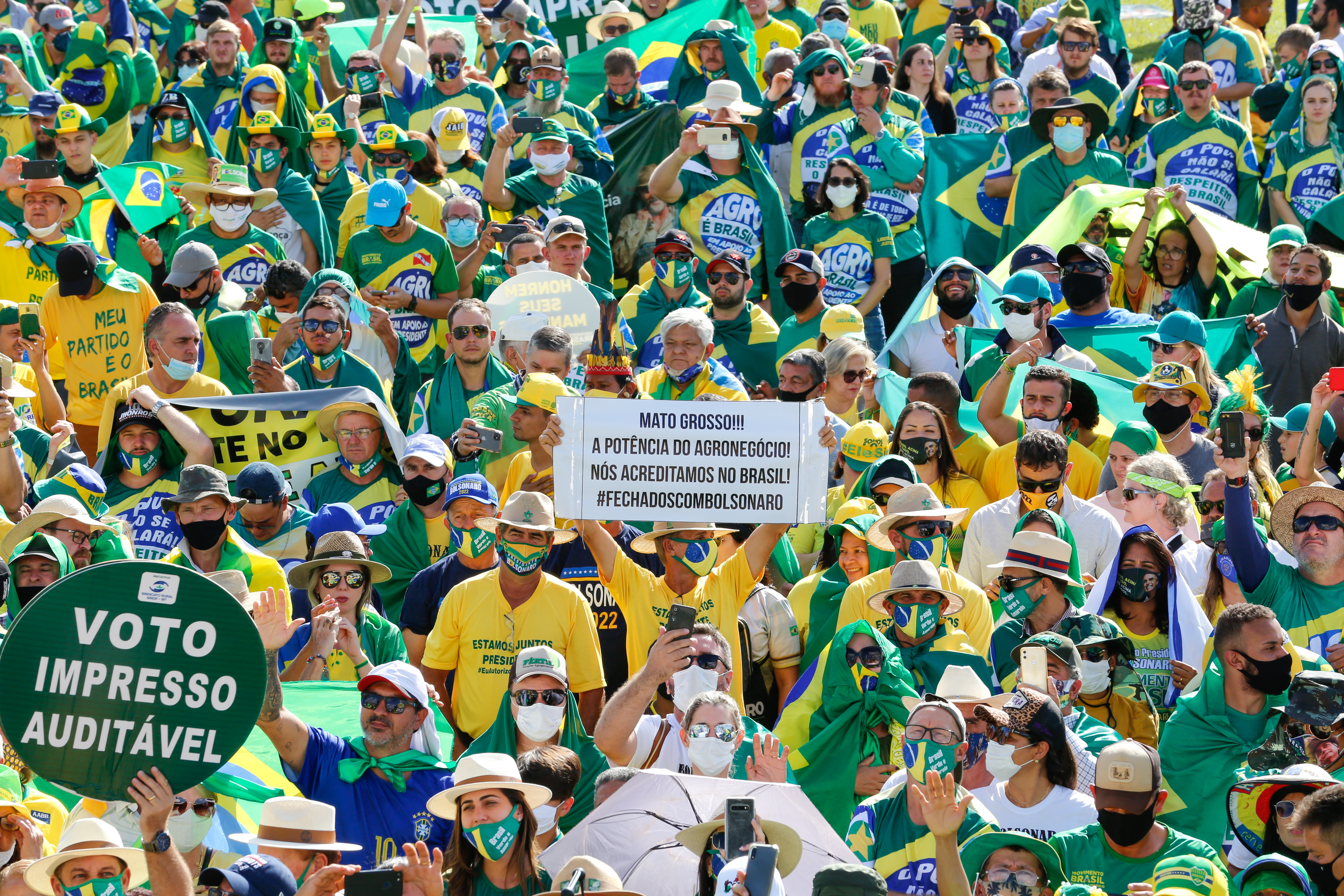
Pro-government protest in Brasília on 15 May 2021

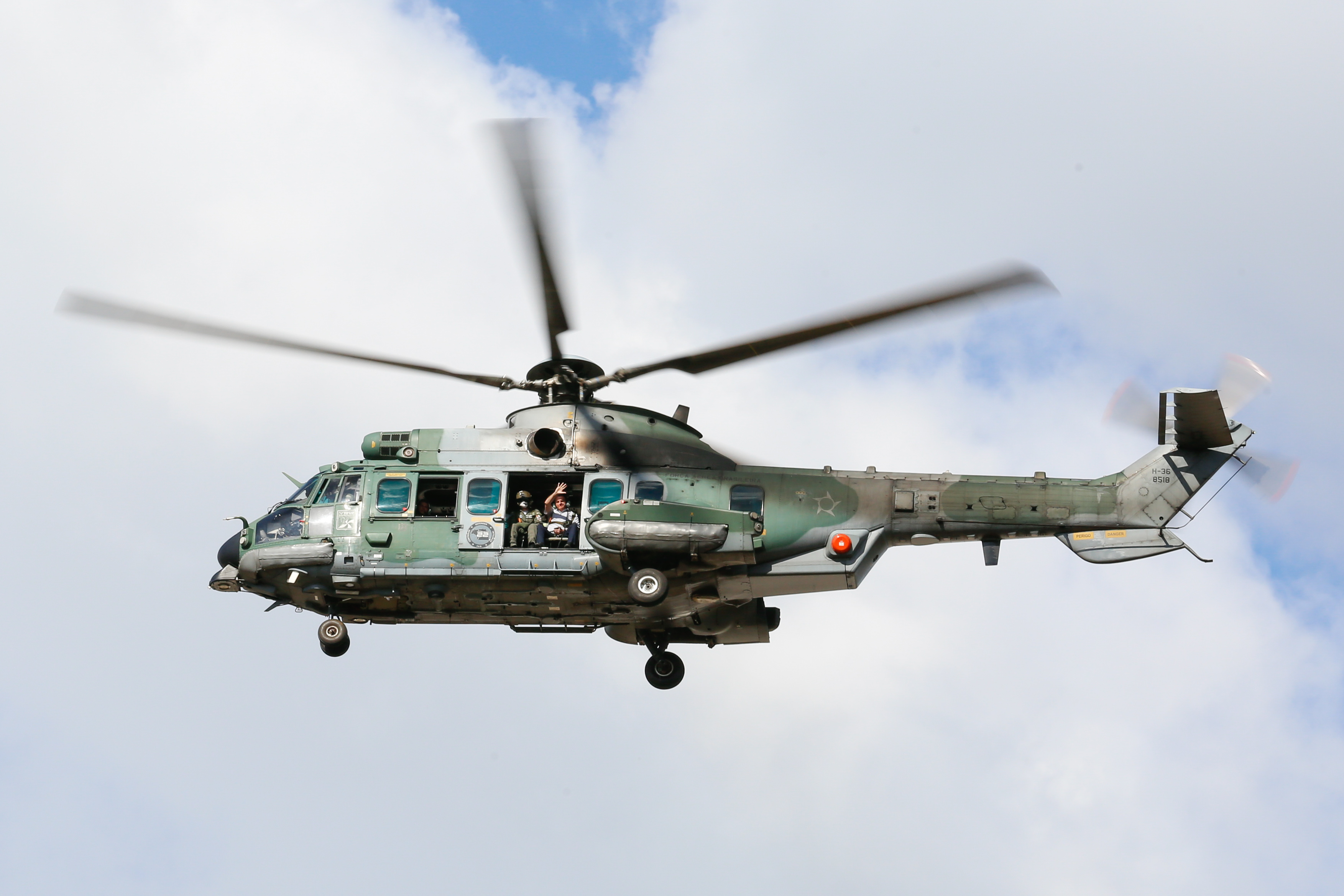
Bolsonaro flies over protests in Brasília on 15 May 2021

On 1 May, protest in favor of Jair Bolsonaro happened around the country. The protesters demanded the end of lockdowns, as well as a military intervention on the judicial and legislative branches of power. The protests happened in many Brazilian cities, occupying avenues such as Avenida Paulista. Bolsonaro flew by helicopter over the protests in Brasilia, where there were also protests against his government.

=== Chile ===
On 18 March, riots took place at the communes of El Bosque, La Pintana, and other communes in the Santiago Metropolitan Region. Rioters are denouncing the hunger resulting from the partial and total lockdowns in the region. They claim that the lockdowns have left them without work and means of sustenance.

=== Colombia ===
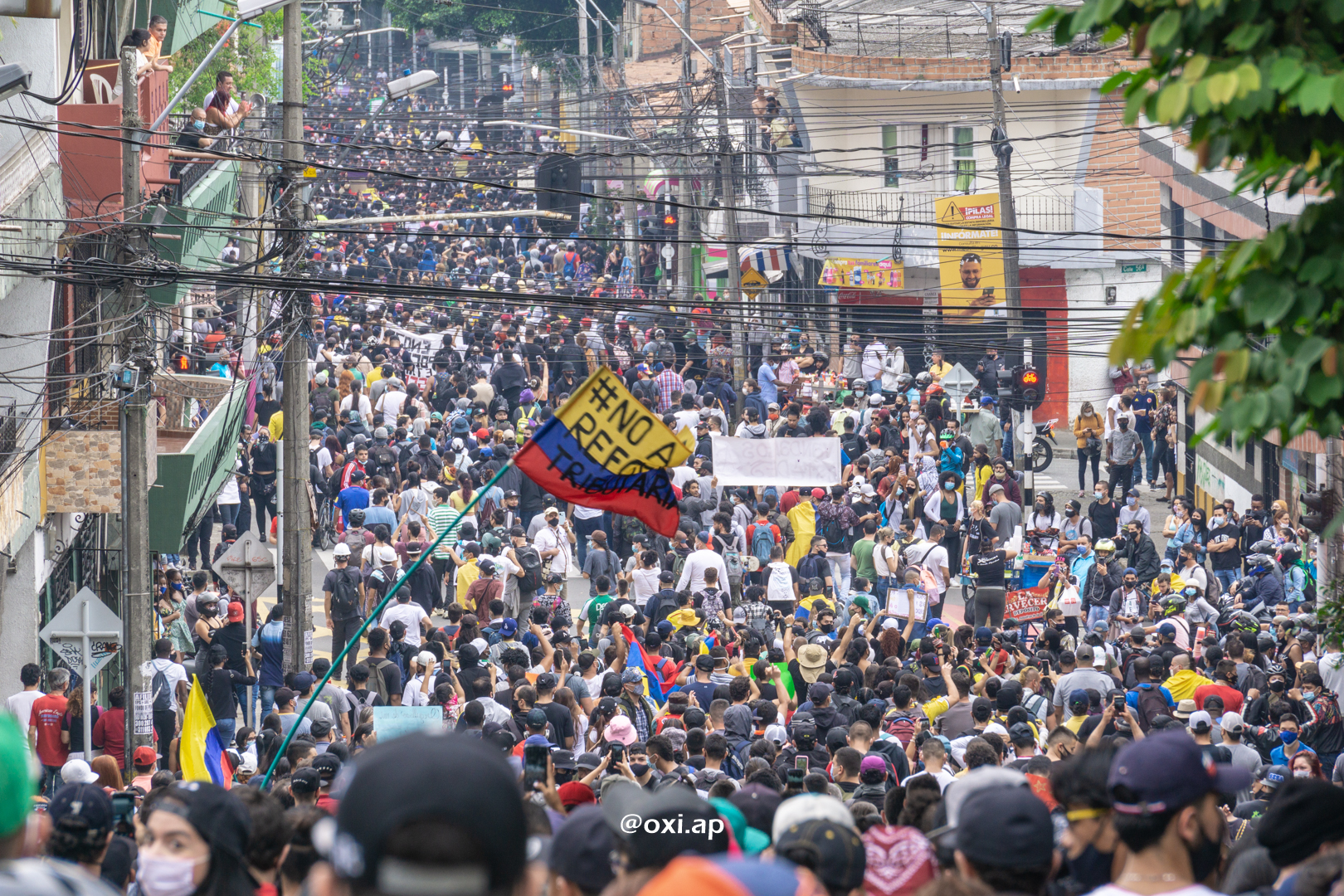
Protesters in Medellín, Colombia on 1 May 2021

In April 2021, President Iván Duque proposed increased taxes at a time when the COVID-19 pandemic in Colombia was beginning to worsen as various healthcare systems were failing throughout the country. A series of protests began in Colombia on 28 April 2021 against increased taxes, corruption, and health care reform.

=== Ecuador ===
The 2020 demonstrations in Ecuador were a series of national mobilizations carried out in May 2020, after the announcement of economic measures by the government of Lenín Moreno adopted due to the serious health and economic crisis generated by the COVID-19 pandemic in Ecuador.

=== Paraguay ===
On 5 March, protests broke out across Paraguay due to the lack of efficient government response against the pandemic in the country. The protests gathered thousands of people, and left hundreds of injured. It culminated in the resignation of the then health minister Julio Mazzoleni.

== See also ==
- Impact of the COVID-19 pandemic on politics
- National responses to the COVID-19 pandemic
- Strikes during the COVID-19 pandemic
- Face masks during the COVID-19 pandemic
  - Face masks during the COVID-19 pandemic in the United States
- Cholera riots
