= 2022 Brussels protests =

Protest against COVID-19 restrictions in Belgium

- Part of COVID-19 pandemic in Belgium
- Date: 24 January 2022
- Location: Brussels, Belgium
- Methods: Protest, civil unrest, property damage

Parties
Protesters	Government of Belgium

Number
50,000+	

Casualties
- Arrested: 250

On 24 January 2022, a protest erupted in Brussels, Belgium, against COVID-19 rules. More than 50,000 people began the protest at the capital's North Station and ended it at the Parc du Cinquantenaire/Jubelpark, near the European institutions. The demonstration was scheduled to last until 2 p.m., but when it had not finished by 3 p.m., the police started to disperse protesters. Police arrested about 250 people and took protesters' devices in their custody.

At the end of the protest, clashes between the police and protesters also broke out, in which the police used tear gas and water cannons. However, a few dozen protesters spread to the surrounding streets, from where government buildings were attacked, including the European External Action Service (EEAS) building on the Robert Schuman Roundabout, and many vehicles, including cars and motorcycles, were set on fire.

== Aftermath and reactions ==
Various politicians, including government officials in Brussels, expressed outrage at the loss, calling it against the spirit of freedom of expression enjoyed under democracy.

The European External Action Service also protested in a tweet. The European Union's foreign affairs chief, Josep Borrell, also inspected the items, including the broken door.
