= COVID-19 pandemic in mainland China =

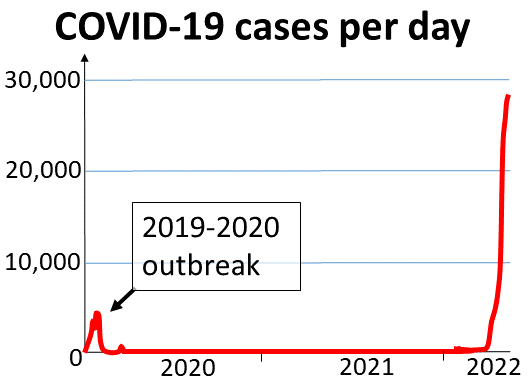
- Rolling average of confirmed COVID-19 cases per day in mainland China
- Disease: COVID-19
- Pathogen: SARS-CoV-2
- Location: Mainland China
- First outbreak: Wuhan, Hubei
- Index case: 1 December 2019 (6 years, 11 months and 3 weeks ago)
- Confirmed cases: 99,381,761; 503,302 (symptomatic)
- Suspected cases: 1.1 billion+ (CCDC estimate in January 2023)
- Recovered: 379,053
- Deaths: 122,398
- Vaccinations: 1,318,026,800 (total vaccinated); 1,284,479,600 (fully vaccinated); 3,516,880,600 (doses administered)

The COVID-19 pandemic in mainland China is part of the worldwide pandemic of coronavirus disease 2019 (COVID-19) caused by severe acute respiratory syndrome coronavirus 2 (SARS-CoV-2). China was where the first COVID outbreak occurred, the first where authorities imposed drastic measures in response (including lockdowns and face mask mandates), and was one of the first countries to bring the outbreak under control, at least temporarily.

The 2019–2020 COVID-19 outbreak in mainland China was the first wave of the disease, and was first manifested as a cluster of mysterious pneumonia cases, mostly related to the Huanan Seafood Market in Wuhan, the capital of Hubei province. It was first reported to the local government on 27 December 2019 and published on 31 December. On 8 January 2020, a new coronavirus (SARS-CoV-2) was identified as the cause of the pneumonia by Chinese scientists. By 29 January, the virus was found to have spread to all provinces of mainland China.

By late February, the pandemic had been brought under control in most Chinese provinces. On 25 February, the reported number of newly confirmed cases outside mainland China exceeded those reported from within for the first time. By mid-2020, widespread community transmission in China had ended and restrictions were significantly eased.

Until late 2022, the Chinese government response included a zero-COVID strategy, which aims to eliminate transmission of the virus within the country and allow resumption of normal economic and social activity, making it one of few countries to pursue this approach. By late 2020, China's economy continued to broaden recovery from the recession during the pandemic, with stable job creation and record international trade growth, although retail consumption was still slower than predicted.

Infection rates increased in 2022, and on 3 April of that year, China reported 13,146 new cases of COVID-19 in the past 24 hours, which was the highest single-day total of new cases since the height of the 2020 outbreak. Following nationwide protests in November and December of that year, the Chinese government relaxed many of its previous restrictions, effectively ending the zero-COVID policy and leading to a massive surge in cases.

== Context ==
New infectious diseases impose a serious threat to the health of the general public. Their origins are often mysterious despite intensive research efforts. Although human coronaviruses (CoVs) had been known as major pathogens to cause the common cold, a new species of coronavirus, namely SARS-CoV caused an epidemic involving 29 countries during 2002–03 which infected 8098 persons and killed 774 of them. The evidence shows that the virus might have originated from an animal coronavirus, but somehow entered the human population. Its outbreak also implies that animal coronaviruses could be a potential danger to humans.

Since the 2003 SARS outbreak, the general public and the scientific community in China have been worried about the potential return of the deadly virus which motivated the Chinese government to reform its public health system to handle the next public health crisis. As part of the reform, China expanded the laboratory networks to handle the pathogens of the infectious diseases which included a newly built BSL-4 laboratory in Wuhan and a national key laboratory to investigate into pneumonia with unclear causes. Zeng Guang, the chief scientist at China CDC believed that a quicker publication of the epidemic information was a lesson that China learned from the SARS outbreak as the lack of information release worsened the outbreak.

With the improved public health system, China managed to handle several public health emergencies. In coping with the 2009 H1N1 flu outbreak starting from Mexico, China developed and distributed vaccines to 100 million people within months as an active prevention. During the 2013 H7N9 outbreak in East China, the country's health system identified the pathogen 5 days after the outbreak. Test kits for diagnosis were designed and distributed to all mainland provinces 3 days after the identification. Within months, effective vaccines were developed. Chinese academic Li Lanjuan and her group were the first to reveal the virus's transmission methods, molecular mechanisms and effective treatment.

However, Southern Metropolis Daily stated that although people paid more attention to public health, the government's funding to the health system was far from enough as CDCs in smaller municipalities had to reduce their staff. Ten years after the SARS outbreak, few people wore a face mask when they had respiratory symptoms and the hospitals were cutting the fever clinics off. Despite confidence in winning the next battle against SARS, Zhong Nanshan who earned fame in fighting the SARS outbreak in 2003 still held a conservative attitude to whether the Chinese officials would lie to the people about a disease outbreak. As of 2017, mainland China had only 36 critical care beds per million people; in comparison, South Korea had 106, and Taiwan 285, beds per million people.

Early cases surrounding the animal market suggested potential animal-to-human transmission while later the virus was found to be able to transmit from ill people to others. There have been cases where asymptomatic patients transmitted the virus to others. According to China NHC, the virus transmits by droplets or close contact while some proposed that feces could also be where the virus hides and transmits from. The typical symptoms of the viral infection included fever, dry cough, dyspnea, headache and pneumonia which are usually developed after an incubation time lasting as long as 2 weeks. The existence of mild but infectious cases complicated the epidemic control efforts. It is also noticed that patients might be able to transmit the virus even during the incubation period.

Financial Times described the outbreak as China's Chernobyl moment, increasing the pressure on its leader, Xi Jinping. A trade war with the US, the Hong Kong protests, and an African swine fever outbreak that led to a pork shortage already placed pressure on the current government.

At the end of December 2019, Henan announced the suspension of passenger trains to and from Wuhan. In early January 2020, the local government of Henan Province with its complete disinfection measures, effective and intensive publicity, a strong awareness of epidemic prevention and quarantine among the people, the setting up of return spots at the village entrance and even the use of garbage trucks, the digging of trenches to block roads connecting Hubei and the hanging of slogans such as "returning home with sickness is to dishonor your parents." #抄河南的作业 (lit. 'copy Henan's homework') became a trending hashtag on Weibo.

However, cutting the roads off without authorization is illegal in mainland China as Xinhua and the Public Security Ministry pointed out. The Ministry of Transport asked the local governments to take the principle of "block one, not three" (Chinese: 一断三不断), that is, to block the virus from spreading, but not to block roads, traffic and Internet access, the transportation of emergency supplies and the transportation of essential goods.

== First outbreak ==
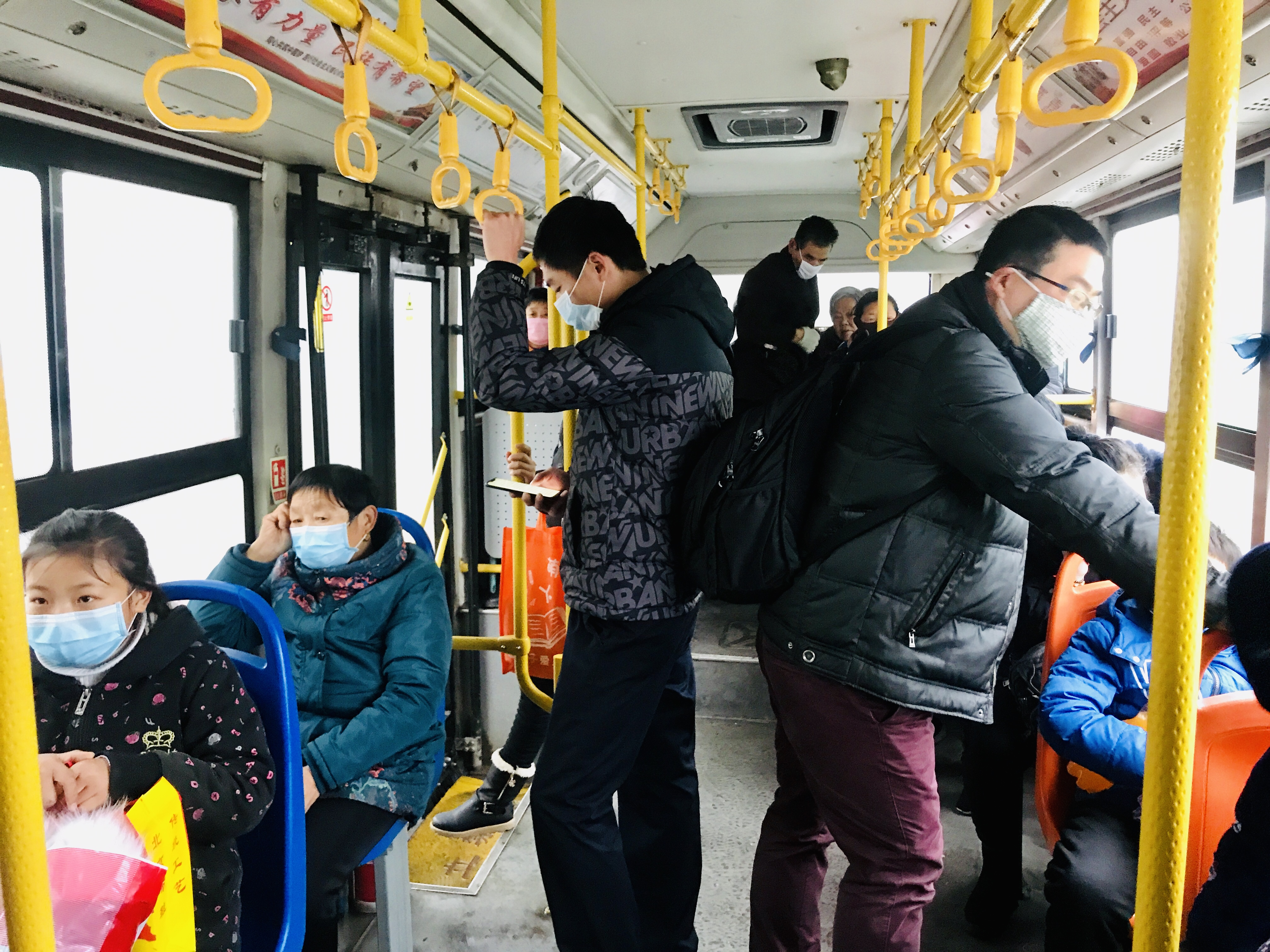
Most people on a bus wearing a mask, Hubei province, 23 January 2020.

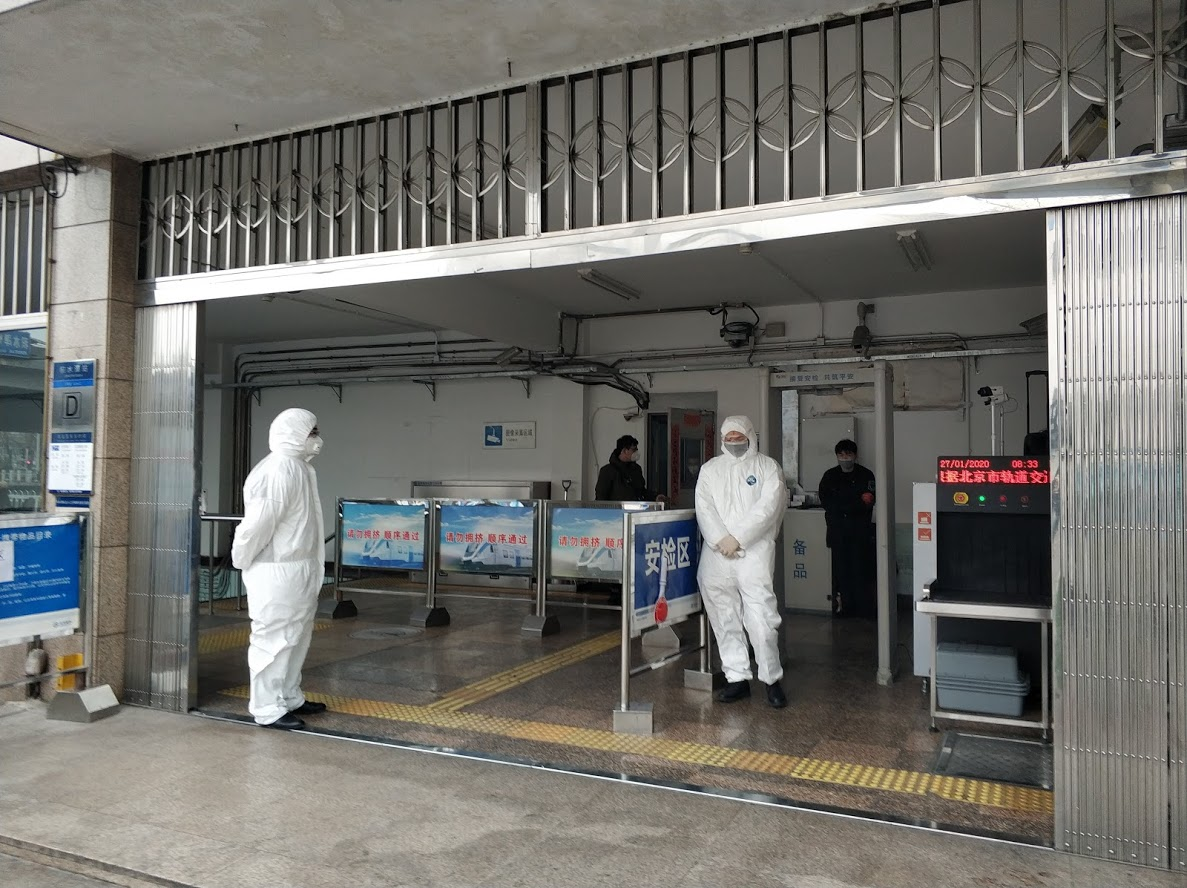
Body temperature screening at Jishuitan subway station, Beijing

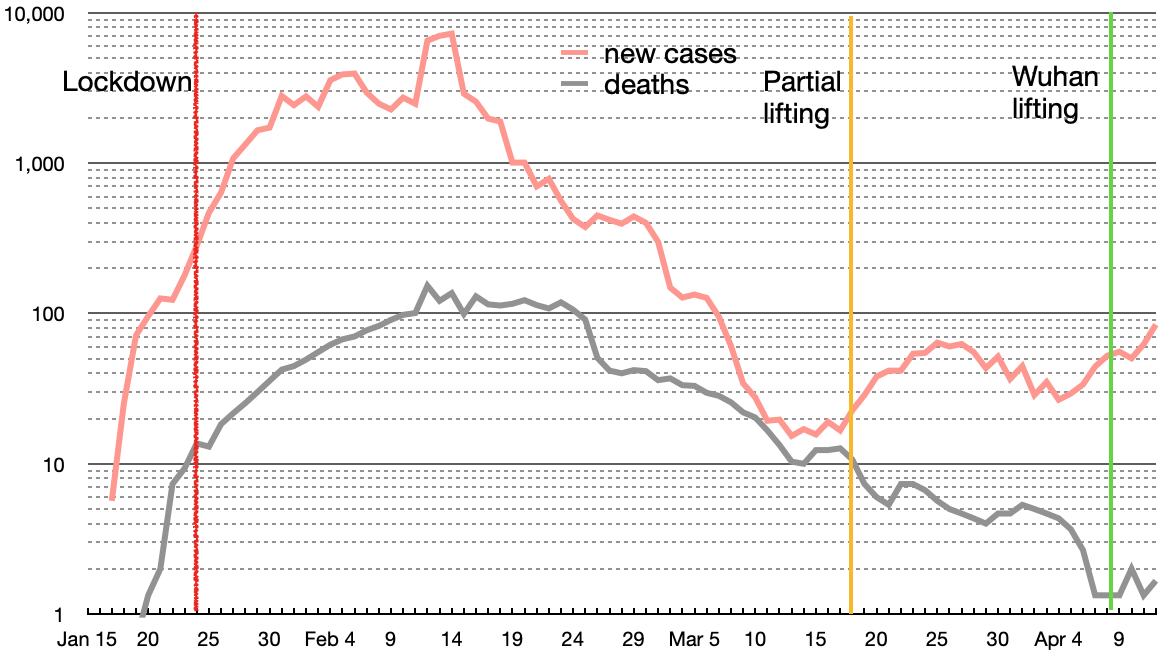
Semi-log graph of new cases and deaths in China during COVID-19 epidemic showing the lockdown and lifting

Based on retrospective analysis published in The Lancet in late January, the first confirmed patient started experiencing symptoms on 1 December 2019, though the South China Morning Post later reported that a retrospective analysis showed the first case may have been a 55-year-old patient from Hubei province as early as 17 November.

The outbreak went unnoticed until 26 December 2019, when Zhang Jixian, director of the Department of Respiratory Medicine at Hubei Xinhua Hospital, noticed a cluster of patients with pneumonia of unknown origin, several of whom had connections to the Huanan Seafood Market in Wuhan. She subsequently alerted the hospital, as well as municipal and provincial health authorities, which issued an alert on 30 December. Results from patient samples obtained on 29–30 December indicated the presence of a novel coronavirus, related to SARS.

Semi-log graph of 3-day rolling average of new cases and deaths in China during COVID-19 epidemic showing the lockdown on 23 January and partial lifting on 19 March.

Within three weeks of the first known cases, the government built sixteen large mobile hospitals in Wuhan and sent 40,000 medical staff to the city.

=== Spread beyond Wuhan ===
Number of cases (blue) and number of deaths (red) on a logarithmic scale. Numbers including Hong Kong and Macau.

On 22 January, Hubei launched a Class 2 Response to Public Health Emergency. Ahead of the Hubei authorities, a Class 1 Response to Public Health Emergency, the highest response level was announced by the mainland province of Zhejiang on 23 January. Stringent measures such as lockdown of Wuhan and the wider Hubei province and face mask mandates were introduced around 23 January, which significantly lowered and delayed the epidemic peak according to epidemiology modelling. Guangdong and Hunan followed suit later on the day. On the following day, Hubei and other 13 mainland provinces also launched a Class 1 Response. By 29 January, all parts of mainland initiated a Class 1 Response after Tibet upgraded its response level on that day.

Yet, by 29 January, the virus was found to have spread to all provinces of mainland China. Hubei party secretary Jiao Chaoliang was removed from office for failure to contain the outbreak. On 31 January, the World Health Organization declared the outbreak a Public Health Emergency of International Concern. A severe shortage of face masks and other protective gear led several countries to send international aid, including medical supplies, to China.

On 25 March, authorities began to lift travel restrictions in Hubei outside of Wuhan and people need to confirm their "Green Code" health classification to travel.

On 8 April, Wuhan lifts its lockdown and all transportation in the city resumed operations.

== April 2020–December 2021 ==
=== 2020 ===
On 2 April 2020, the government ordered a Hubei-like lockdown in Jia County, Henan, after a woman tested positive for the COVID-19. It is suspected that she may have been infected when she visited a hospital where three doctors tested positive for the virus, despite showing no symptoms.

On 9 April, a COVID-19 cluster was detected in Heilongjiang Province, which started with an asymptomatic patient returning from the United States and quarantining at home. The US CDC reported that the infections were initially spread through a shared elevator used at different times, and led to at least 71 cases by 22 April.

In early May, restrictions were tightened in Harbin.

In June, an outbreak with 45 people testing positive at Xinfadi Market in Beijing caused some alarm. Authorities closed the market and nearby schools; eleven neighborhoods in the Fengtai District started requiring temperature checks and were closed to visitors. By this time, public health technology included special leaf blower backpacks designed to vent hot air onto outdoor surfaces. By the evening of 23 June, Chinese Vice Premier Sun Chunlan declared that the situation had been brought under control. China's traffic authorities vowed to strictly guard traffic out of Beijing: those with abnormal health QR codes or without recently-taken negative PCR test proof would not be allowed to take public transportation or drive out of the capital.

On 26 July, China saw its highest number of daily cases since March, mostly from outbreaks in Xinjiang and Liaoning, with 61 new cases, up from 46 cases a day earlier. This increased to 127 daily COVID cases on 30 July. The daily reported cases subsequently went down, to 16 on 23 August.

In July, Xinjiang province and its capital Ürümqi were locked down in the wake of the discovery of new cases in the city.

On 11 October, officials in Qingdao urged to carry out contact tracing and mass testing after 12 new cases were found connected to the Qingdao Chest Hospital. On 12 October, it was announced that Qingdao would test all 9 million of its residents.

In October, 137 asymptomatic cases were detected in Kashgar, Xinjiang and were linked to a garment factory.

On 18 December, a local case was reported in Beijing. It was the first local infection in 152 days in Beijing. As of 27 December, thirteen more cases have been detected. Another outbreak linked to a traveler from South Korea was reported in Liaoning late December.

=== 2021 ===
In January 2021, many cities and districts in the province of Hebei, Jilin and Heilongjiang were put into lockdown to contain a new outbreak in the region.

On 7 January, Dalian authorities reported 51 confirmed COVID-19 cases and 31 asymptomatic carriers.

On 6 January, after reporting 63 new cases in the northern province of Hebei, of which 20 were infections and 43 asymptomatic cases locally transmitted, the local Government decided to lockdown the provincial capital city of Shijiazhuang, as most of the cases were detected there. On 9 January, the cities of Shijiazhuang and Xingtai with total population of 19 million, were placed under lockdown measures, with passenger trains suspended, as well as flights and coach service to Beijing at 300 km distance in north east direction.

On 14 January, Wangkui County of Suihua City, Heilongjiang Province moved into lockdown after reporting 40 confirmed COVID-19 cases. The virus sample taken from the cases in Suihua is reported to be similar to the strain identified in Dalian.

Also on 14 January, China reported the first death from the virus after eight months, a patient from Hebei. A team of experts from the WHO visited Wuhan to conduct investigations into the origin of the pandemic. They were also supposed to quarantine for two weeks prior to starting their inquiry. On 15 January, the city of Langfang of Hebei was put into lockdown.

By 18 January, eleven regions in China were under de facto lockdown, including five districts in Heilongjiang and the cities of Gongzhuling and Tonghua in Jilin province. On 20 January, residents of Daxing District of Beijing were banned from leaving the capital region.

On 4 April, China saw the largest number of reported COVID-19 cases in over two months, with 15 new reported cases of local transmission in the city of Ruili on the Burmese border. This followed a previous outbreak in Ruili in September 2020. Unauthorized border crossings from Myanmar remain a concern, and the local government has started vaccinating Ruili residents to work towards herd immunity.

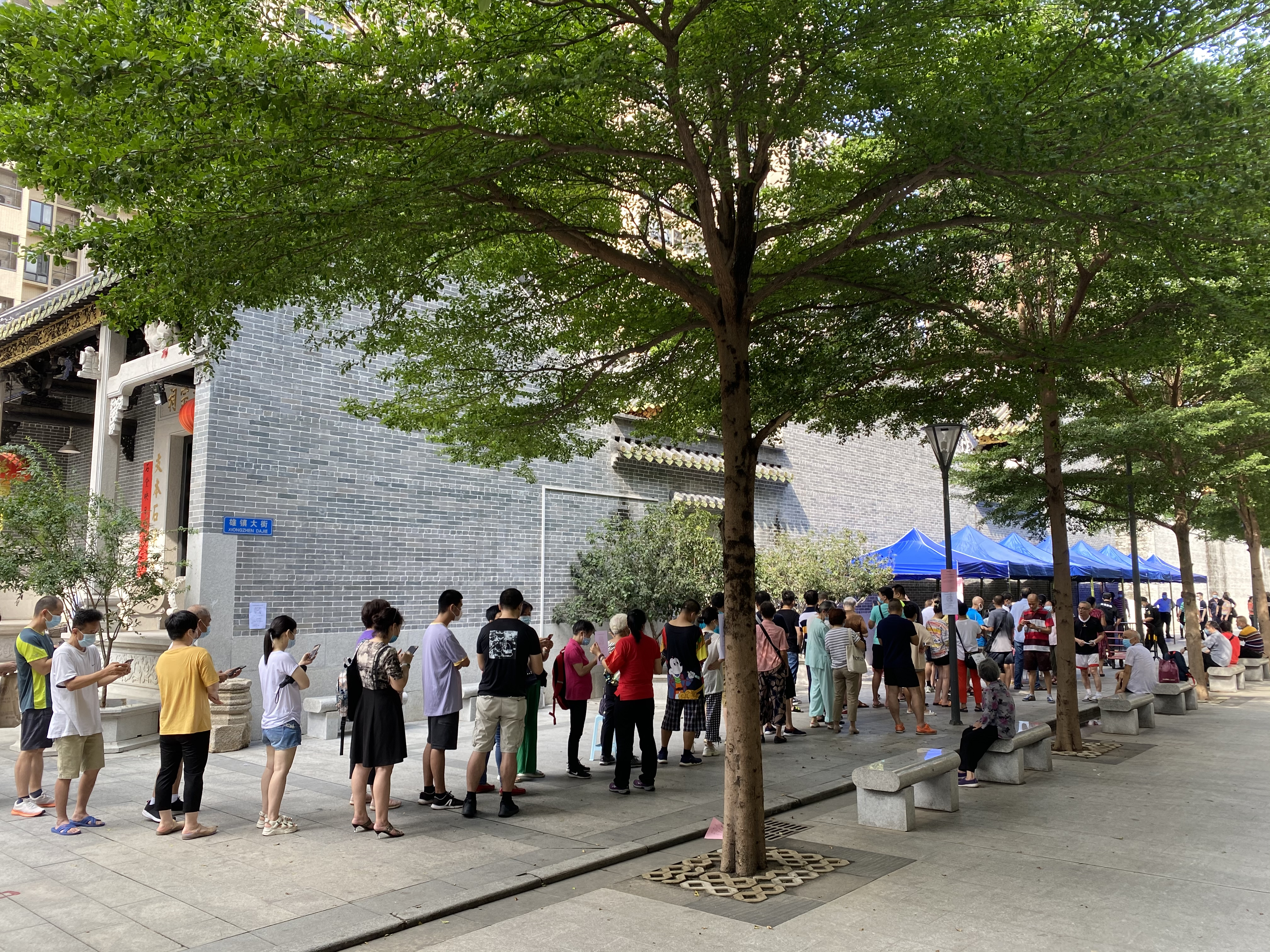
People waiting for nucleic acid testing in Yangji, Guangzhou, Guangdong, 29 May 2021

On 29 May, authorities shut down some streets in Liwan District in Guangzhou due to an outbreak in Guangdong province. Foshan's Shadi Airport has canceled all flights and suspended operations from 12 June.

On 6 June, Ruili was again put into lockdown after three local infections associated with the Delta variant.

On 10 July, it was reported that the new outbreak has spread to 13 cities in five provinces including the capital Beijing. The cases were linked to cleaners who worked on a flight from Russia that arrived in Nanjing on 10 July 2021 who did not follow strict hygiene measures. Officials added that the highly contagious Delta variant of the virus was behind these new infections and there are worries about whether the Chinese vaccines would work against the Delta variant.

On 21 July, another local cluster was identified in Nanjing after 17 airport workers have tested positive during a routine check up. By 2 August, the outbreak, caused by fast-spreading Delta variant, has reached more than 20 cities. Zhuzhou, Zhangjiajie and Yangzhou were forced into lockdowns. Some flights, trains and buses to Beijing have been canceled to guard the capital against the new surge.

On 11 September, another cluster of infections was found in Xianyou county of Putian, Fujian province. Multiple clusters have also emerged in Bayan county of Harbin, Heilongjiang, the source of infections remains unclear.

On 23 October, China reported the highest number of new cases since the September outbreak in Fujian, with domestic infections reported in Ejin Banner of Inner Mongolia and in Lanzhou, Gansu and new cases reported in Beijing, Ningxia, Jiangxi and Yunnan. Another outbreak by imported case was reported in the northern border town of Heihe, Heilongjiang province.

On 26 October, the city of Lanzhou was put into lockdown after six new cases were detected.

In early November, Dalian reported more than 80 cases of COVID-19, the first of which occurred in a warehouse worker in the Zhuanghe district of the city on 4 November. In response, on 8 November local authorities ordered all businesses handling imported chilled and frozen foods to suspend operations.

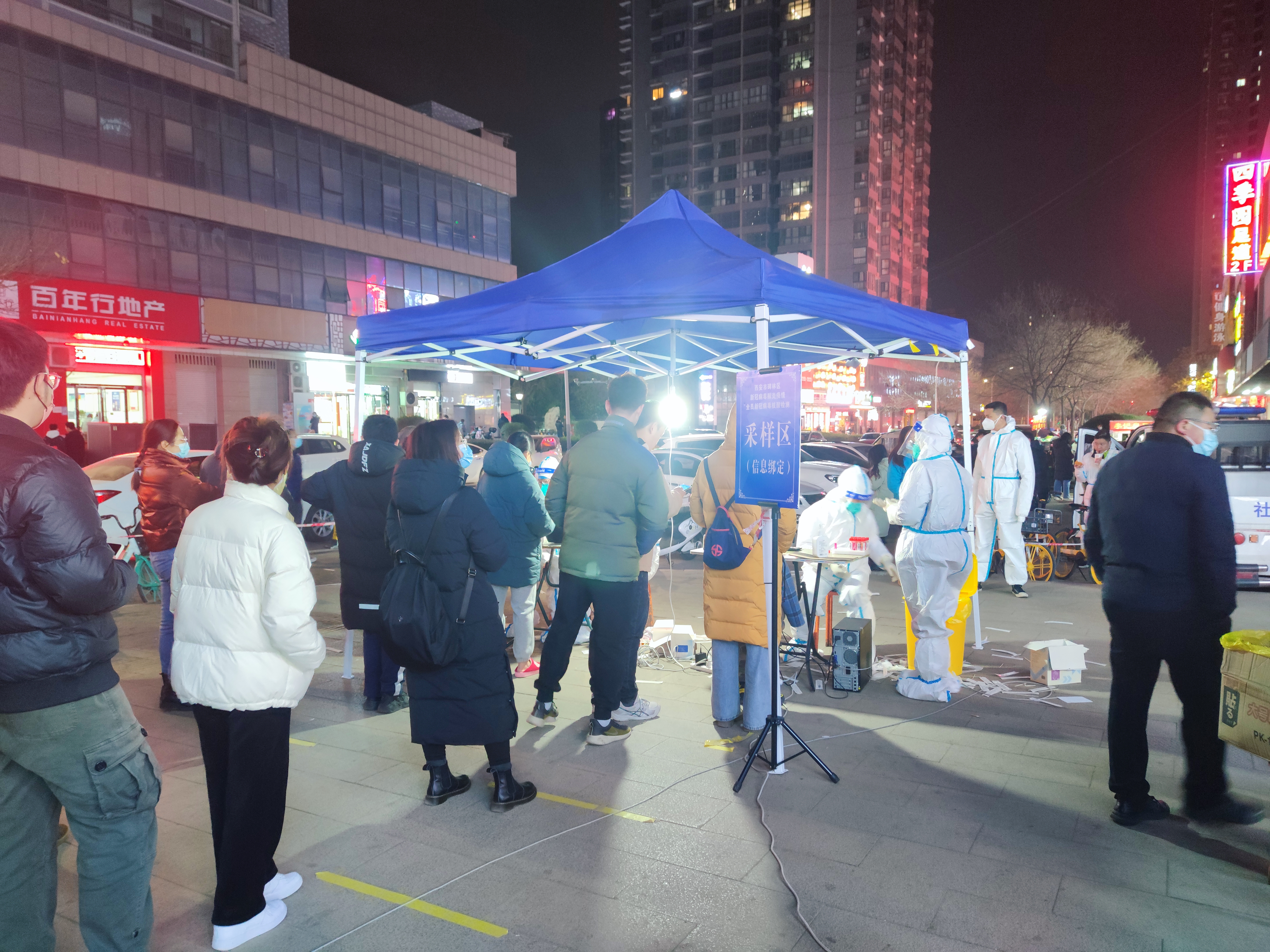
A nuclear acid testing site at Beilin, Xi'an, Shaanxi, 17 December 2021

In mid-December, the outbreak in the cities of Ningbo, Shaoxing and Hangzhou was developing at a "relatively rapid" speed, forcing closure of flights and venues. The outbreak began to subside from mid December, with Hangzhou resuming low-risk status as of 21 December.

On 22 December, the border city of Dongxing next to Vietnam has ordered residents to stay at home due to one COVID-19 case. The strict measures resulted in severe backlog of trucks at the border crossings and disrupted trade, prompting the Vietnam government to complain.

From 23 December 2021, the city of Xi'an with 13 million people was put into strict lockdown after local authorities reported more than 250 cases, traced to the Delta variant by authorities. The lockdown led to stressed healthcare and delayed or insufficient food deliveries to some parts of the city.

On 26 December 155 domestically transmitted cases with confirmed symptoms were reported from Xi'an, contributing the largest part to the countrywide highest daily count since the outbreak in Wuhan, of 158 cases. The city was placed into strict lockdown until 24 January 2022.

The city of Ruili bordering Myanmar was reported to have endured four lockdowns with 200 days in total in 2021.

== 2022: Outbreaks and end of lockdowns ==
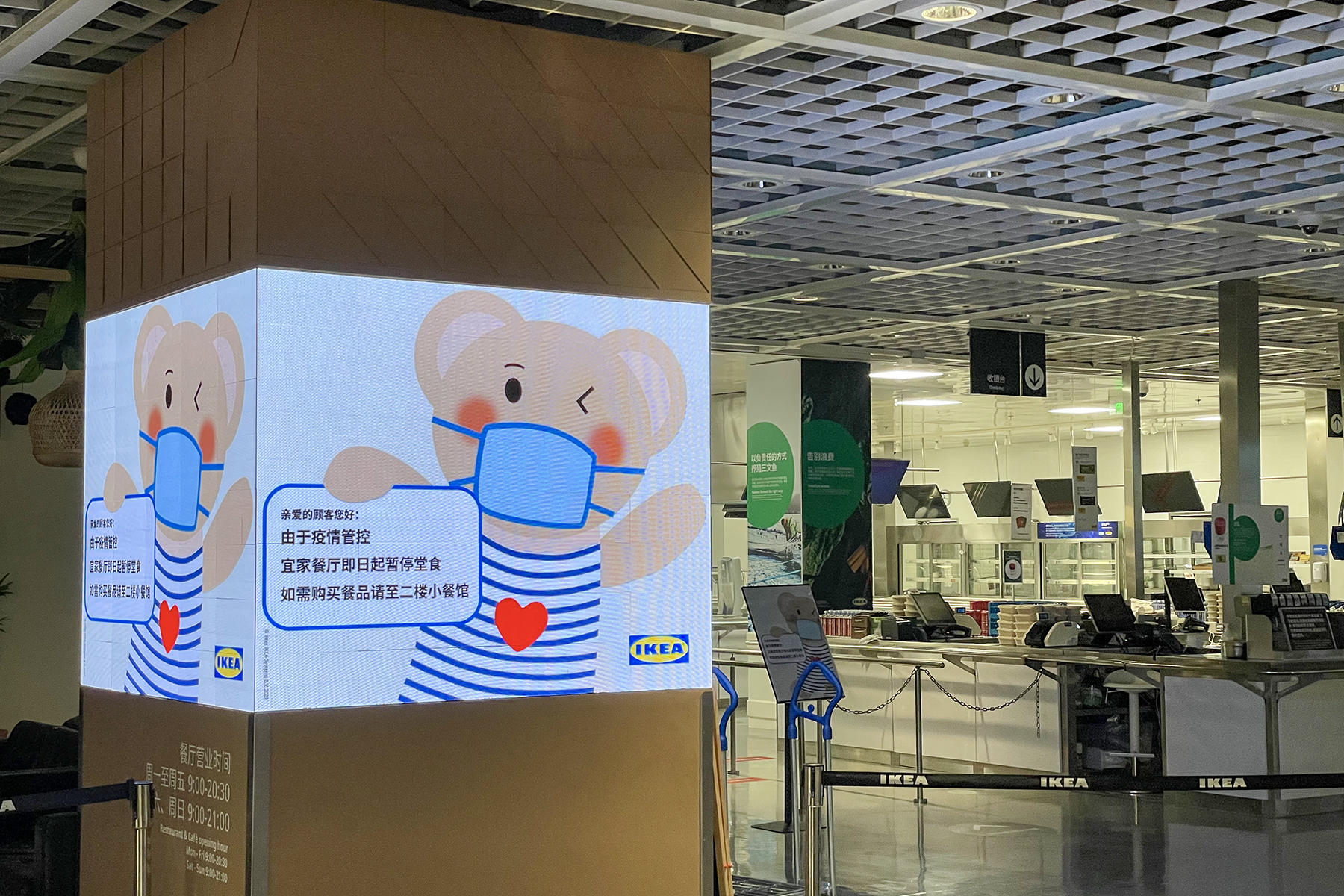
Notice regarding the suspension of eat-in at an IKEA restaurant in Zhengzhou, Henan, January 11, 2022

On 4 January 2022, 1.1 million people in Yuzhou, Henan received stay at home order after three asymptomatic COVID-19 cases were reported. In the evening of the same day, Zhengzhou told its residents in risky areas that they could not leave the city without approval from health control authorities. The Xi'an outbreak appeared to ease, with 35 local symptomatic cases reported that day.

On 11 January, the city of Zhengzhou has upgraded measures and closed down non-essential services during a citywide mass testing campaign while Anyang has been placed under lockdown.

On 24 January, lockdown restrictions were lifted in Xi'an while 2 million residents of Fengtai district of Beijing underwent mass testing. On 25 January, the border city of Suifenhe was placed into lockdown.

On 7 February, the city of Baise in Guangxi province has been placed under lockdown after 37 symptomatic cases were reported on the day before. That same month, a team of analysts from Lanzhou University predicted that the pandemic would end in late 2023.

On 11 March, the city of Changchun of Jilin Province was placed into lockdown after the highest single day spike in cases since the Wuhan outbreak was reported. Food shortages related to shutdown measures were reported. Sporadic outbreaks have been reported in Laixi and Huangdao of Shandong province.

On 14 March, the city of Shenzhen was placed on lockdown, with factories halting production after new virus cases doubled nationwide to almost 3,400. The neighboring city of Hong Kong was also battling a severe outbreak since January. Schools and public transport were closed in Shanghai and people were forbidden to enter or exit Jilin as the entire province is closed to curb the virus spread.

On 15 March, the whole area of Langfang city, Hebei and the factory center of Dongguan in Guangdong were put into lockdown. The earlier shutdown of Shenzhen has forced manufacturers such as Toyota, Volkswagen and Apple's supplier Foxconn to suspend operations. The Shenzhen lockdowns ended on 23 March.

On 20 March, China reported its first COVID-19 deaths since January 2021 and the first double daily toll since May 2020, with both fatalities coming from Jilin.

On 23 March, lockdowns were implemented in the cities of Tangshan and Shenyang.

On 28 March, the Shanghai city government announced the largest city-wide lockdown in China since the outbreak began in which Shanghai will be locked down in two stages. The city of Shanghai became the country's COVID-19 epicenter after a surge in cases. Shanghai's lockdowns has hit operations at the city's ports, causing disruptions on the logistical chain to the manufacturing hubs nearby. There were reports of panic buying to stock up supplies in the city.

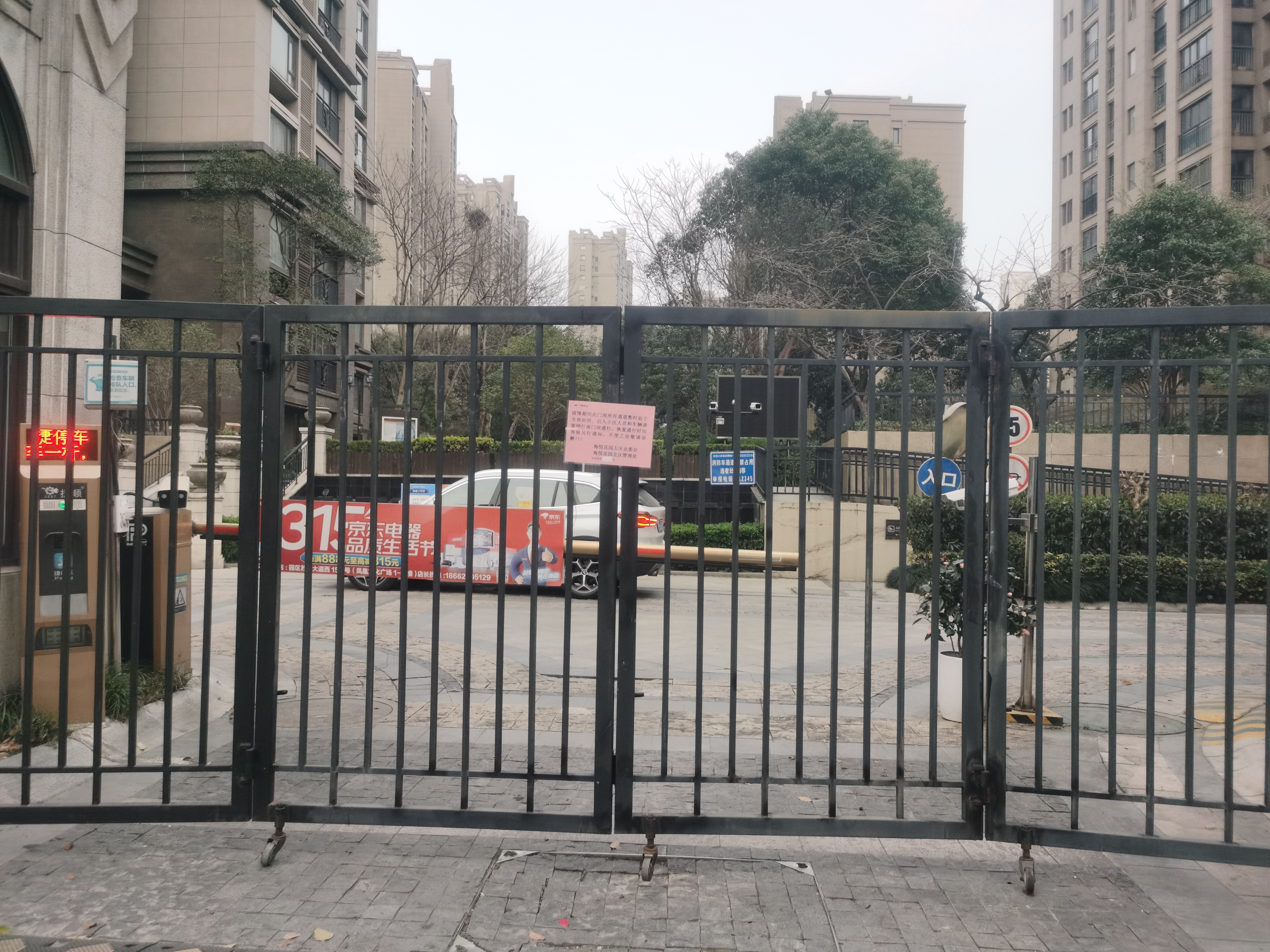
Closure of a microdistrict's west gate due to the pandemic, Jiangsu, March 14, 2022

On 30 March, the city of Xuzhou in Jiangsu has imposed a three-day lockdown.

On 3 April, China reported 13,146 new cases of COVID-19 in the past 24 hours, which was the highest single-day total of new cases since the height of the pandemic in Wuhan in February 2020.

On 4 April, officials in Suzhou announced a new mutation of the Omicron variant was detected in Changshu. The city of Baicheng in Inner Mongolia was put into lockdown.

=== March–May 2022 Shanghai outbreak ===
By 9 April, it is estimated that 23 Chinese cities, home to an estimated 193 million people and contribute 22% of China's GDP, have been implementing either full or partial lockdowns. In Shanghai, residents have reported food shortages due to lockdown measures. The city's health system has shown signs of strain as patients were turned away from hospitals as wards were closed and medical staff have been deployed to quarantine hospitals. A series of deaths were reported at the Shanghai Donghai Elderly Care hospital, which their relatives blame on lack of care due to hospital staff being taken away for quarantine. Videos have emerged on social media showing Shanghai residents engaging in protests and clashes with police over quarantine policies.

=== Increasing of rolling lockdown measures ===
On 11 April, authorities in Guangzhou closed the city to most arrivals and only allowed citizens with a "definite need" to leave. Lockdown measures continue to spread to other cities in China as restrictions on movement were reported in Suzhou, Zhengzhou, Taiyuan and Ningde.

On 16 April, a temporary partial lockdown was again imposed in Xi'an after dozens of infections were reported.

On 19 April, Tangshan re-enforced partial lockdowns in some of its districts.

On 26 April, Baotou in Inner Mongolia announced it will lock down for a week while Beijing begins mass testing of nearly all of its 21 million residents. On 28 April, Hangzhou started mass testing while the wholesale hub of Yiwu and the port city of Qinhuangdao were put into lockdown.

On 30 April, China recorded 47 deaths from Covid within 24 hours, bringing the total toll above 5,000. A Caixin media report cited that Handan, Lu'an, Quanzhou, Suqian, Wuhu, Xining, Xuzhou along with many cities in Jilin, Shanxi, Heilongjiang, Jiangsu and Shaanxi were locked down in April, with more than 30 million people affected.

The province of Jilin began to gradually lift COVID-19 control measures from the end of April. It reported a GDP shrinkage of 7.9% during the first quarter of 2022.

On 3 May, the city of Zhengzhou imposed new movement restrictions, which halts all activities and only allows each household to one person with a negative test result to go out once a day to purchase basic supplies.

On 13 May, Beijing authorities announced that parts of Chaoyang, Fangshan and Shunyi districts would be subject to tighter curbs. On 22 May, lockdowns have been imposed on those three districts along with Haidian and Fengtai.

On 24 May, the city of Tianjin locked down its central district, causing delays and blank sailings at its ports.

On 31 May, Shanghai began to start lifting its strict lockdown measures, allowing people to return to work and malls and shops to re-open in "low-risk" areas. In some neighborhoods and districts, residents were ordered to stay home until mid-June after completion of rounds of rigorous testing.

On 6 June, Beijing authorities further relaxed curbs by allowing indoor dining while the city of Erenhot and the Sonid Right Banner of Xilin Gol, Inner Mongolia have imposed lockdowns.

On 13 June, an outbreak linked to a nightclub forced Beijing authorities to shut down the Workers' Stadium and Sanlitun leisure and nightlife districts. Despite the flare up, Beijing declared an "initial victory" over COVID-19 on 16 June and allowed schools to resume in-class teaching on 27 June.

On 29 June, the county of Sixian of Anhui was put into lockdown. On 1 July, Anhui put a second county, Lingbi, under lockdown.

On 6 July, Shanghai reported the most virus infections since late May, with sporadic cases also propped up in Xuzhou and Wuxi. On 9 July, the city of Haikou on Hainan Island imposed seven-day restrictions that shut down businesses and public venues.

On 10 July, Qinyang in Henan province almost completely locked down its residents while Xi'an and Lanzhou moved to tighter curbs. On 12 July, Wugang, Zhumadian and Pingdingshan in Henan implemented a three days implementation of strict closed control.

On 13 July, Huaiyuan of Anhui and Lanzhou of Gansu were reported to have shifted into full lockdown. On 14 July, China reported an increase in cases tally as a new cluster emerged around Beihai, Guangxi. On 17 July, lockdown was imposed in Beihai and the tourist island of Weizhou, trapping more than 2,000 holidaymakers. Dandong's mayor has apologised for an over 50-day lockdown that the North Korea-bordering city had to endure.

On 27 July, authorities in Wuhan shut down Jiangxia District of almost a million people after detecting four asymptomatic cases.

Throughout July, Shenzhen's biggest manufacturers including Foxconn, Huawei and BYD were forced to operate within a "closed loop" restricted system as the manufacturing hub was battling its latest Covid outbreak.

On 3 August, the export hub of Yiwu in Zhejiang suspended public gatherings and locked down some areas to cope with COVID-19 flare ups.

On 6 August, authorities in the resort city of Sanya of Hainan announced movement restrictions after hundreds of cases were reported, leaving around 80,000 tourists stranded. Danzhou, Qionghai and other cities on the island also enforced lockdown measures.

On 8 August, Lhasa, the regional capital of Tibet recorded one symptomatic patient and seventeen asymptomatic cases while Shigatse, Tibet's second biggest city imposed three days of curbs. The region reported only one infection in 2020, and had remained clear of cases since then. On 10 August, Ürümqi in Xinjiang started a five-day lockdown of its key districts. Other cities in Xinjiang including Yining, Korla, Aksu and Turpan were also hit by circuit breaking mechanism.

On 21 August, Taigu and Pingyao of Shanxi and Nanchong of Sichuan went into lockdown. On 28 August, Hebei authorities issued a stay-at-home order for residents of Xianghe, Zhuozhou and all urban districts of Shijiazhuang. On 31 August, Daqing in Heilongjiang was put into lockdown.

On 1 September, Chengdu announced a lockdown of its 21.2 million residents, the most populous city to be locked down since Shanghai earlier in 2022. Other major cities including Shenzhen and Dalian also stepped up COVID restrictions. On 5 September, Guiyang sealed off six of its districts to contain Covid outbreak. On 15 September, lockdowns were mostly lifted in Chengdu, save for six districts.

On 18 September, a bus carrying 47 people from Guiyang being taken to quarantine in Libo County crashed in Sandu County of Guizhou province, killing 27 on board. The accident set off a storm of anger online over the harshness of strict COVID policies.

On 5 October, Xishuangbanna of Yunnan province went into full lockdown, leaving travellers stranded at its airport. On the same day, residents were banned from leaving Xinjiang over an outbreak, weeks after the region had been relaxing restrictions following a stringent lockdown.

On 17 October, Zhengzhou locked down its district Zhongyuan to tame a virus flareup. On 18 October, a 14-year-old girl died after falling ill in a quarantine center in Ruzhou after being denied prompt medical care, according to her family's account. The case has sparked anger online, forcing censors to remove hashtags for "Ruzhou Girl" online.

On 26 October, hundreds of migrant workers in the Tibetan capital of Lhasa took to the streets to protest harsh lockdown measures, which had been lasting for 74 days.

In late October, dozens of cities across China have again ramped up their lockdowns, including districts of Shanghai, Guangzhou, Wuhan, Zhengzhou, Datong and Xining, affecting more than 200 million people. In Heilongjiang province, Suihua and Mudanjiang were also experiencing outbreaks. In Zhengzhou, workers at the Foxconn factory have turned to social media for help and to voice their anger about inadequate food and lack of medical care amid strict control measures implemented on the campus. The complex employs more than 200,000 workers, thousands of them chose to escape the campus en masse, trekking across fields to return to their home.

On 2 November, the death of a 3-year-old boy to a gas leak in Lanzhou, reportedly after delay in receiving treatment due to movement restriction has triggered a wave of public anger. Videos on social media show residents taking to the streets demanding answer from authorities and buses containing SWAT teams arriving at the scene. Local authorities issued apologised the next day.

On 9 November, movement restriction measures were placed in the urban districts of Chongqing. It was reported that the city has been struggling to contain spread of virus.

=== Protests and end of zero-COVID measures ===
In Guangzhou, a surge in cases has spurred blanket lockdowns in the city. On 5 November, Haizhu District was locked down and transport systems were suspended. On 9 November, the city reported more than 3,000 cases and locked down its central district of Liwan. On 14 November, it has been reported that residents in several districts have taken to the streets to protest against restriction policies. Videos posted online showed crowds crashing through lockdown barriers and marching down streets.

On 21 November, Beijing authorities shut most non-essential business and issued stay home order in the city's largest district of Chaoyang. The city reported three COVID-related deaths on the weekends before, the first deaths in mainland China since the Shanghai outbreak in May.

On 23 November, China reported 31,444 new locally transmitted COVID-19 cases, the highest daily figure since the virus was first detected in 2019 and surpassing figures during the Shanghai outbreak between March and May. The government responded by tightening restrictions in cities including Beijing, Shanghai and Guangzhou. The government of Changchun urged the public to halt non-essential movement and avoid going outside. In Zhengzhou, protests erupted at the Foxconn iPhone manufacturing factory campus over poor pay and restriction conditions, after authorities attempted to lock down the facility following an outbreak.

On 24 November, a building fire in under-lockdown Ürümqi killed ten people and wounded nine. This sparked widespread protests against lockdowns and COVID-19 policies across major Chinese cities, prompting the Chinese government to signal plans to ease restrictions. On 30 November, vice premier Sun Chunlan announced that pandemic controls are entering a "new stage and mission", adding that the Omicron variant is less virulent and that rectification of control methods are underway. Sun said local governments should "respond to and resolve the reasonable demands of the masses".

On 7 December, the National Health Commission announced a nationwide loosening of COVID-19 restrictions, in which PCR testing would be reduced and lockdowns would also be limited. Among the changes, the health pass application will no longer be required for entry to most public spaces and patients with mild symptoms may quarantine at home rather than in the facilities.

On 8 January 2023, the Chinese government removed some immigration restrictions and started issuing more passports to Chinese citizens and more visas to foreign nationals after almost three years of significant restrictions due to anti-pandemic control measures. The Hong Kong government also announced it would start to reopen its border with mainland China, allowing people to travel without quarantine.

On 15 March 2023, China opens its borders to foreign tourists after more than three years of restrictions by allowing all categories of visas to be issued.

== December 2022–January 2023 surge ==
Following the rapid scaling down of stringent zero-COVID restrictions, Beijing reported a surge in COVID-19 infections. The Chinese central government's reported death statistics only include cases in which COVID-19 directly caused respiratory failure, which led to skepticism by health experts of the government's total death count. Restaurants and food delivery services were reported to have closed due to too many workers being infected and pharmacies have been emptied of medicine and disinfectant solution.

On 10 December, reports of Covid surges in smaller towns across China have attracted nationwide attention. In Dazhou and Baoding, locals said that clinics are seeing an overflow in patients. The Central Economic Work Conference, a key economic policy meeting, was subsequently postponed due to the spike in infections. On 15 December, the National Health Commission has stopped reporting asymptomatic cases as it was "impossible to accurately grasp" the actual number of asymptomatic infections.

On 20 December, the Chinese State Council narrowed its definition of what would be counted as a COVID-19 death, specifying that only deaths caused by pneumonia and respiratory failure would count toward the total number of fatalities resulting from SARS-CoV-2. This decision came as long lines of hearses appeared outside of crematoriums throughout China and medical students at universities nationwide protested for better pay and increased protections at overcrowded hospitals.

On 22 December, a report by UK research firm Airfinity modelling based on regional Chinese data estimated that more than 5,000 people are probably dying each day from COVID-19 in China, with cases rising fastest in Beijing and Guangdong province. Internal minutes from a meeting of China's National Health Commission held on 21 December revealed that as many as 248 million people in China might have contracted COVID-19 over the first 20 days of December and nearly 37 million people may have been infected on a single day.

On 23 December, Qingdao's municipal health chief Bo Tao has been quoted in a news report that the city was seeing "between 490,000 and 530,000" new infections each day. On the same day, Dongguan's health commission declared on its Weixin account that the city had 250,000 to 300,000 people being infected every day. Officials in Yulin, a city of 3.6 million people in Shaanxi province, logged 157,000 new infections with models estimating more than a third of the city's population had already been infected.

On 25 December, the National Health Commission announced that it would no longer report daily COVID-19 figures. Zhejiang provincial government said it is battling around a million new infections a day and expected the number to be doubling in days ahead.

A New York Times report on 27 December shown patients in gurneys crammed into corridors in Tianjin's Medical University General Hospital. The report also highlighted a shortage of medicines and a staffing crisis in hospitals in several major cities. As China reopened in December 2022, an analysis of obituaries by the Times also found that retired Chinese scientists and scholars had begun to die at higher rates than would normally be expected, adding to speculation that deaths had been undercounted.

On 30 December, the World Health Organization asked the National Health Commission and the National Disease Control and Prevention Administration to share more data about its surge of cases, as some countries began to require negative COVID-19 tests for Chinese travelers amid fears of new variants of concern. The WHO also invited Chinese health authorities to share "detailed data on viral sequencing" ahead of a 3 January advisory meeting.

On 3 January 2023, the People's Daily reported that up to 70% of Shanghai's population has been infected. In Ruijin Hospital, the volume of patients in the emergency unit has doubled to 1,600 people per day, 80% of them being Covid-related. Reports emerged of hospitals in the city being overcrowded and funeral homes inundated with mourners.

In a 4 January media briefing, Director Tedros Ghebreyesus of the World Health Organization stated that Chinese hospitalization and mortality data lacked transparency and timeliness, while reiterating the importance of viral sequencing during the outbreak and continued vaccination efforts.

As of 6 January 2023, the infection rate of Henan province had reached 89 percent, according to Kan Quancheng, director of the province's health commission. This percentage of infections meant that roughly 88.5 million people had contracted COVID-19 within just one month of the country's reopening, though Kan noted that visits to fever clinics in the province had peaked on 19 December.

On 11 January, infections had reached 64 percent of China's population, or 900 million people, according to a Peking University study which further specified that the largely rural provinces of Gansu, Yunnan, and Qinghai had infection rates of 90%, 84%, and 80%, respectively. Earlier in January, the Chinese CDC began to focus efforts on protecting less-developed regions of the country ahead of Chunyun, the world's largest annual migration, with roughly two billion trips expected around Chinese New Year, many taking place to and from the Chinese countryside. Travellers were urged not to visit their elderly relatives to prevent them becoming infected.

On 14 January, the Chinese National Health Commission reported 59,938 COVID-related deaths from 8 December 2022 to 12 January 2023, following complaints that it was withholding data. The figure includes 5,503 people who died of respiratory failure caused by COVID and 54,435 fatalities linked to other underlying illnesses. Up until this data disclosure, the official death toll in China had previously only totaled 5,241 people for the entirety of the pandemic. Reuters reported that doctors were discouraged by hospital authorities from citing COVID-19 on death certificates.

On 21 January, the Chinese CDC estimates that as many as 80% of people have been infected, hence the possibility of a rebound in cases in the next two or three months is low. On 22 January, it reported nearly 13,000 COVID-related deaths in hospitals between 13 and 19 January.

On 25 January, the Chinese CDC released data showing the infection wave had been past its peak, with severe cases and deaths in hospitals down almost 90 per cent since infection peak. During the peak, there were 128,000 critically ill COVID patients in Chinese hospitals on 5 January and the number of deaths in hospitals reached their highest point of 4,273 cases on 4 January.

On 30 March, Chinese authorities announced a plan of random spot checks to be conducted at health facilities throughout the country in order to determine the future accuracy of local COVID data reporting amid global calls for more transparency during the winter surge.

Zhejiang provincial data, reported on in July 2023, showed a 70% increase in cremations during the first three months of 2023, an increase of 99,000 cremations compared to the first quarter of 2022. This data was subsequently taken down from public sources.

On 14 April, Chinese official data indicated that COVID-19 positivity rate went up slightly in early April, but specialists noted that it is "unlikely" China will see another wave of large-scale infections. Authorities have dropped mandatory mask requirements when using public transport, signaling the end of the pandemic according to CCDC epidemiologist Wu Zunyou.

On 22 May, leading Chinese pulmonologist Zhong Nanshan contradicted earlier predictions and noted that the first major wave of infections following the reopening surge was beginning to build, with 65 million cases per week expected by the end of June. Zhong noted that China would soon release specific vaccines tailored toward the XBB Omicron subvariants, which were likely driving the latest wave.

In November 2023, China's health authorities reported an outbreak of respiratory illnesses in several parts of northern China. The increase in these diseases was attributed the circulation of known pathogens, including SARS-CoV-2.

== Impact ==
E-commerce contributed substantially to China's COVID-19 pandemic response by facilitating fast delivery of personal protective equipment, food, and daily use consumer goods during lockdowns.

=== Education ===
On 27 January 2020, the Chinese Ministry of Education advised all higher education institutions to postpone the spring semester, with all local education departments to determine the starting time of the new semester for K-12 education and local colleges according to the decision of the local governments. The Ministry of Human Resources and Social Security also decided to put the new semester off for all vocational education facilities.

=== Religion ===
The Chinese government, which upholds a policy of state atheism, used the pandemic to continue its antireligious campaigns, demolishing Xiangbaishu Church in Yixing and removing a Christian cross from the steeple of a church in Guiyang County.

=== Public discourse ===
In 2020 and 2021, although successive and lengthy lockdowns occasionally caused distress in border towns, the majority of publicly expressed commentary appeared to be largely in favor of China's stringent COVID mitigation strategies as necessary for the protection of human life, even to the point where complaints from locked-down residents sometimes resulted in online vitriol from compatriots outside of these regions.

In 2022, however, with highly infectious Omicron strains impacting the feasibility of China's Zero-COVID policy, public discourse inside China became increasingly divided between citizens in favor of the stringent policies as a matter of both national pride and public health necessity, and people such as university students, migrant workers, and small business owners who felt that the restrictions on movement and livelihood were, in and of themselves, a cause of undue suffering. In turn, upon the abrupt abandonment of Zero-COVID, some proponents of the discarded policy went on to criticize the government's sudden U-turn and question the need for a single, unified voice on such matters.

Other commentators reacted with anger toward participants in the recent protests, blaming them for widespread infection and death, although data pointed to Omicron having already overwhelmed the mechanisms of Zero-COVID at the time of the policy's discontinuation. Still others blamed the government for giving into popular demand and thus strengthening foreign and domestic criticism of Chinese policy.

Ultimately, lockdowns in China were highly effective in reducing the spread of COVID-19 and there was wide public consensus in China that the benefits outweighed the costs.

== Government response ==
China is one of a small number of countries that have pursued an elimination strategy, sustaining a low case numbers between the 2020 outbreak until early 2022.

China's response to the initial Wuhan COVID-19 outbreak has been both praised and criticised. Some have criticised the censorship of information that might be unfavorable for local officials. Observers have attributed this to a culture of institutional censorship affecting the country's press and Internet. The government censored whistleblowers, journalists, and social media posts about the outbreak. During the beginning of the pandemic, the Chinese government made efforts to clamp down on discussion and hide reporting about it. Efforts to fund and control research into the virus's origins and to promote fringe theories about the virus have continued up to the present. In October 2020, The Lancet Infectious Diseases reported: "While the world is struggling to control COVID-19, China has managed to control the pandemic rapidly and effectively."

=== Immigration control ===
During the early phase of the pandemic, Hubei suspended the processing of applications from mainland Chinese residents for entry and exit of mainland China. For those with a valid visa to enter Hong Kong and Macau, but fail to enter the areas due to the outbreak, the Chinese Immigration Administration will issue a new visa for free on request of the visa holder after the outbreak is lifted. Some of automated border clearance systems will be shut down according to the needs of the epidemic prevention. After Wuhan declared lockdown on 23 January, the Tianhe Airport and Hankou River ports have been without passengers for several days.

Since 25 January 2020, Taiwan's government banned anyone from mainland China entering the country with the ban extended to mainland Chinese overseas. On 24 August 2022, the Chinese government began to ease restrictions for foreign students, allowing them to enter the country for the first time in more than two years.

=== Lockdown and curfew ===
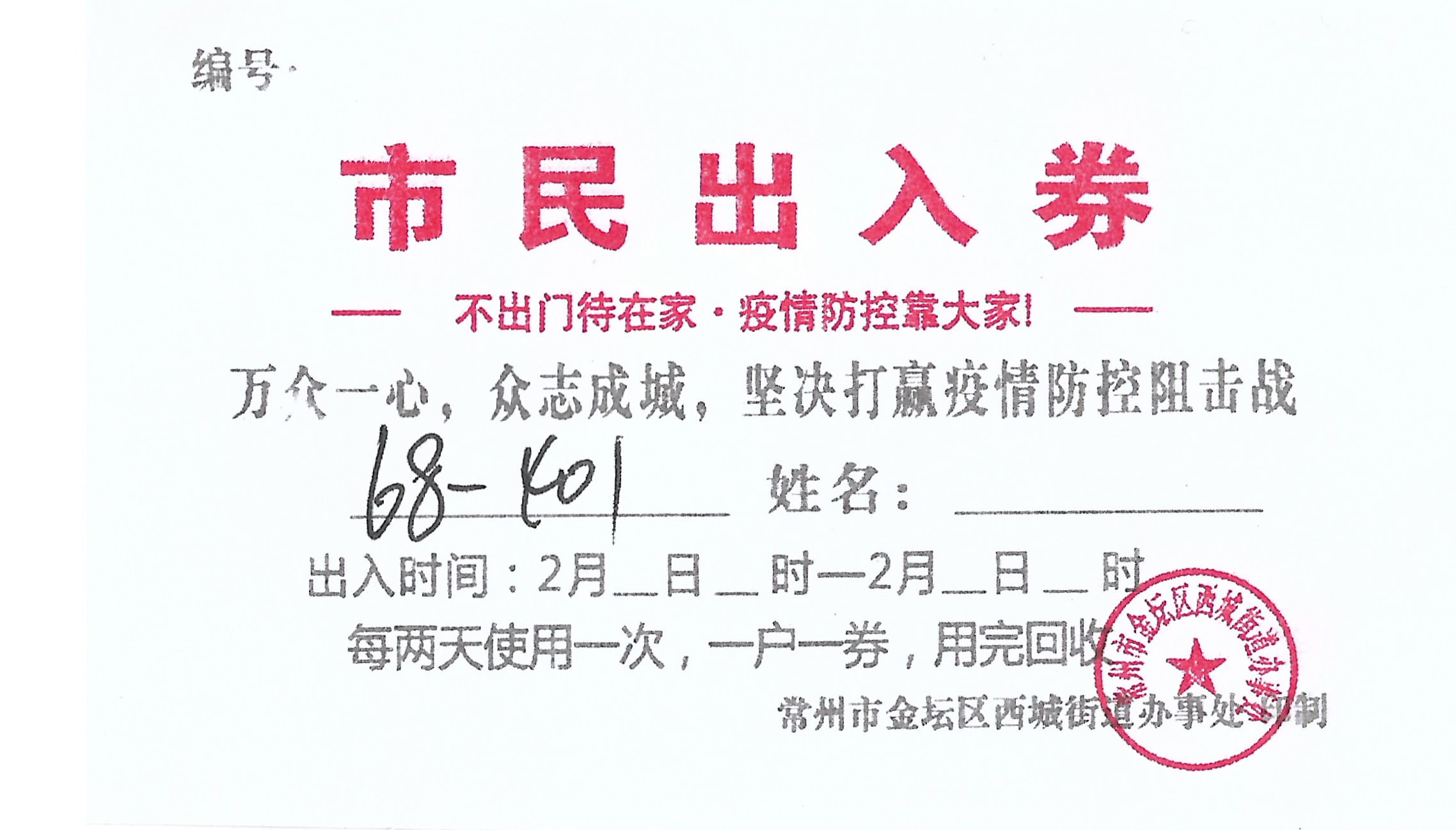
Government-issued permit for Jintan residents. Jintan announced that each family should only have one member to be outdoor for shopping life necessities for every 2 days.

Ever since Hubei's lockdown, areas bordering Hubei including Yueyang in Hunan and Xinyang in Henan set up checkpoints on roads connecting to Hubei to monitor cars and people coming from Hubei. Between 24 and 25 January, the local governments of Shanghai, Jiangsu, Hainan and other areas announced to quarantine passengers from "key areas" of Hubei for 14 days. Chongqing also announced mandatory screening of every person who arrived from Wuhan since 1 January, and set up 3 treatment centers.

During the 2019–2020 COVID-19 outbreak, factories were closed or reduced production for a few weeks. When they opened again, measures were implemented to reduce risk.

=== Vaccination ===
In July 2020, the government granted an emergency use authorization for two COVID-19 vaccines. It has also pledged or provided humanitarian assistance to other countries dealing with the virus.

By June 2021, a billion doses of domestically produced vaccine had been administered in China, giving a dose rate similar to many European countries. A further billion doses had been administered by late August of the same year. Another 1 billion doses were administered by the end of January 2022. In February 2022, Pfizer's Covid therapy tablet Paxlovid has received conditional approval in China. It is the first oral pill created exclusively to treat the disease in the country.

While public authorities have mandated lockdowns and mandatory mass testing for areas with infection, there has not been any rule to making vaccination mandatory. Some facilities within China have made vaccination mandatory for entry, including things like movie theaters, fitness centers, internet bars, museums and libraries.

In July 2022, according to official figures, while 89% had received 2 doses, only 56% of eligible people had received a booster dose. Furthermore, this was even lower among vulnerable elderly age groups, with only 19.7% of people over the age of 80 having received a booster dose. According to BBC reporting, this may have been attributed to public confidence in the ability of authorities to control outbreaks, the narrative presented by public authorities within China that the virus was mainly an overseas problem as well as some doctors within China who warned vulnerable people of the health risks of the vaccine.

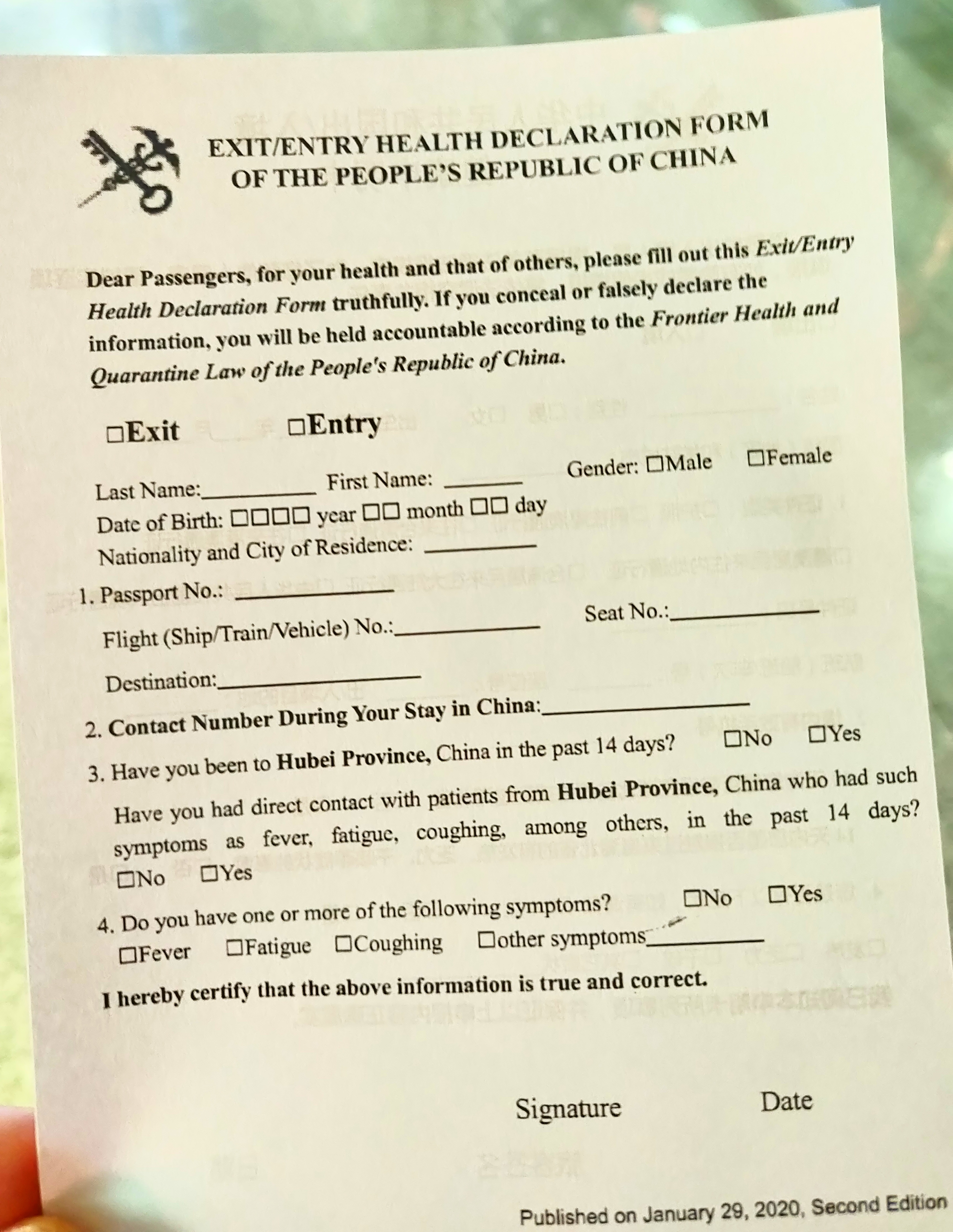
Since 25 January 2020, all passengers entering or exiting mainland China in Beijing, Shanghai and Guangdong must write a health declaration where the individual must answer whether they have been to Hubei Province. This declaration form can also be filled by using WeChat.

China has provided vaccines to other countries. In November 2021, the Chinese government pledged to provide 1 billion vaccine doses to African countries, including 600 million donated doses and 400 million other doses, in addition to the 200 million doses it had already provided. In the same announcement, Xi pledged additional investment in Africa and promised to send 1,500 public health experts.

=== Credit rating relief ===
On 1 February 2020, the People's Bank of China announced it would temporarily suspend the inclusion of mortgage and credit card payments in the credit record of people impacted by the pandemic. Private financial credit scoring companies, including Sesame Credit, suspended financial credit ratings.

=== Redlisting ===
Various cities established mechanisms to incentivize companies to provide pandemic relief, with measures including whitelisting (referred to in China as redlisting) for those donating funds and supplies with benefits like simplified administrative procedures, increased policy support, or increased financial support.

=== Other regulatory measures ===
Following a speech by Xi Jinping emphasizing areas of regulatory compliance, provinces and cities promulgated regulations emphasizing heavy penalties for price hikes, violence against doctors, counterfeit medical supplies, refusal to comply with pandemic prevention measures, and wildlife trade violations.

== Discrimination ==
Fear, regional discrimination in China, and racial discrimination within and beyond China increased with the growing number of reported cases of infections despite calls for stopping the discrimination by many governments. Some rumors circulated across Chinese social media, along with endorsements and counter-rumor efforts by media and governments. The Chinese government has worked to censor and counter reporting and criticism about the crisis – which included the prosecution of several citizen journalists – and portray the official response to the outbreak in a positive light. They have also provided humanitarian assistance to other countries dealing with the virus.

== Misinformation and conspiracy theories ==
According to London-based The Economist, on China's Internet, there were conspiracy theories about COVID-19 being the CIA's creation to keep China down.

Multiple conspiracy articles in Chinese from the SARS era resurfaced during the outbreak with altered details, claiming that SARS is biological warfare conducted by the US against China. Some of these articles claim that BGI Group from China sold genetic information of the Chinese people to the US, with the US then being able to deploy the virus specifically targeting the genome of Chinese individuals.

== Statistics ==
The confirmed case count in mainland China only includes symptomatic cases; asymptomatic infections are reported separately.

== See also ==
- COVID-19 pandemic in China
