= Check-in QR code =

Code scanned to record entry to a location

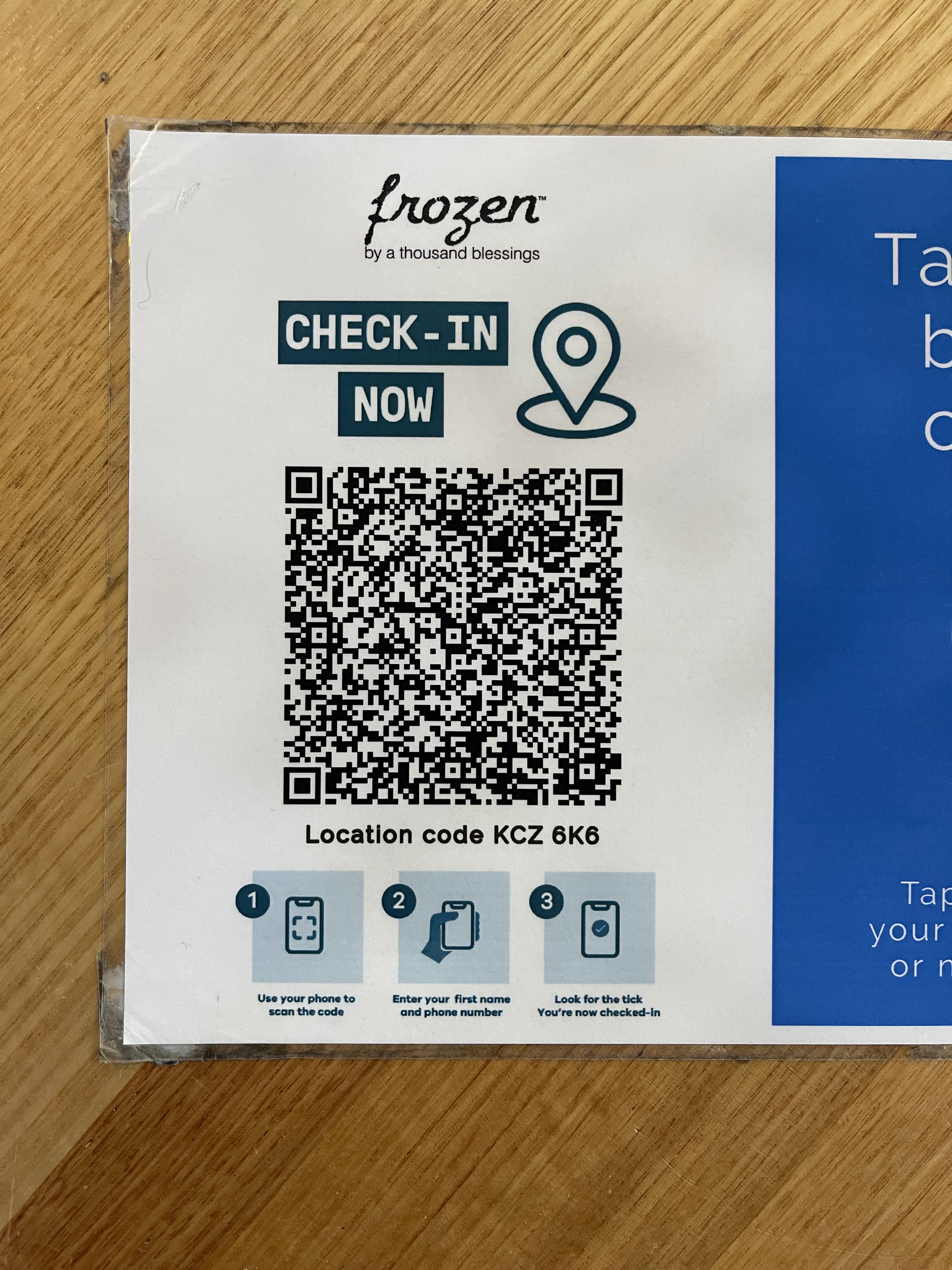
The check-in code used in Doncaster, Victoria, Australia

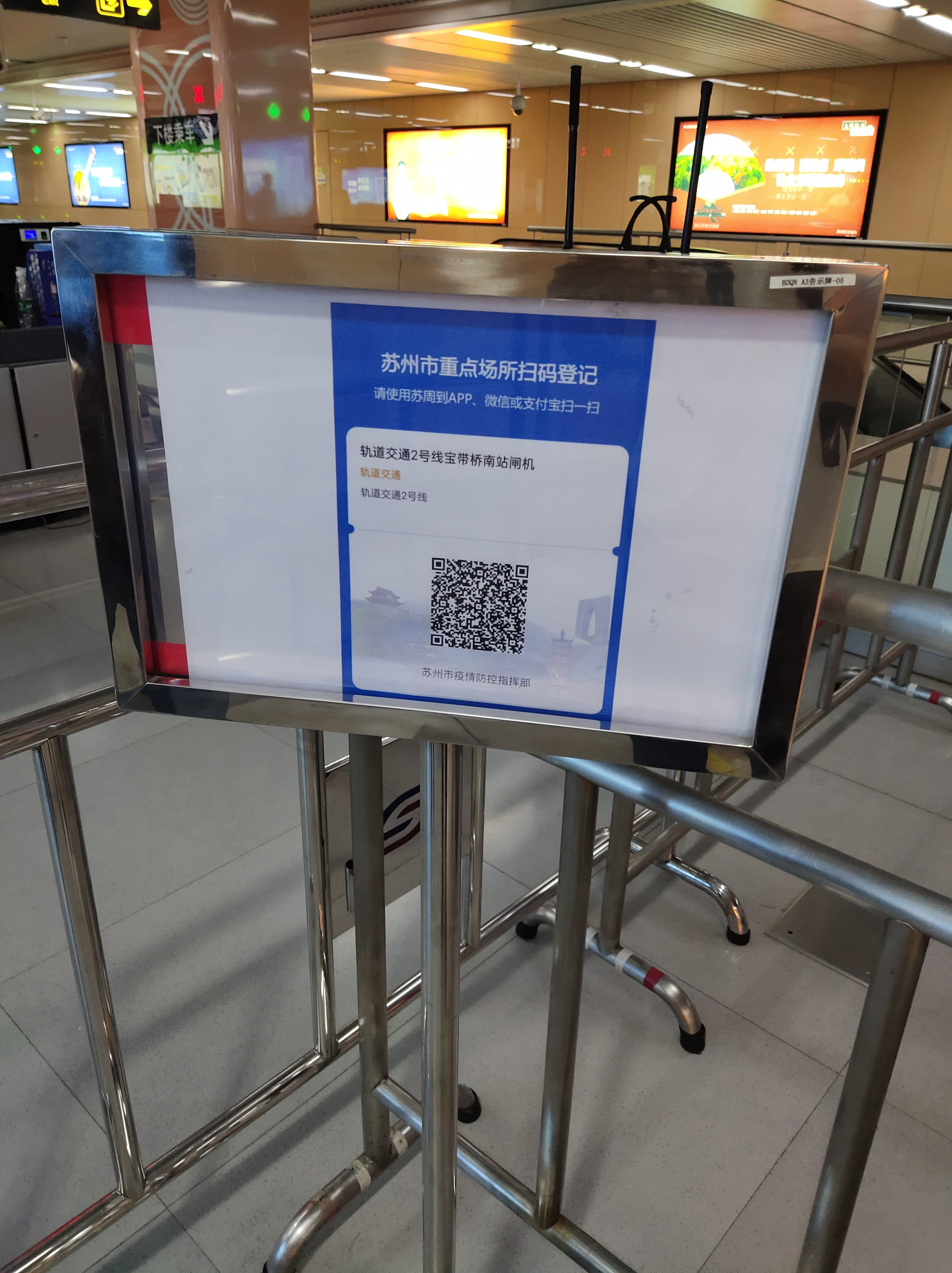
The venue code used in Suzhou, Jiangsu, China

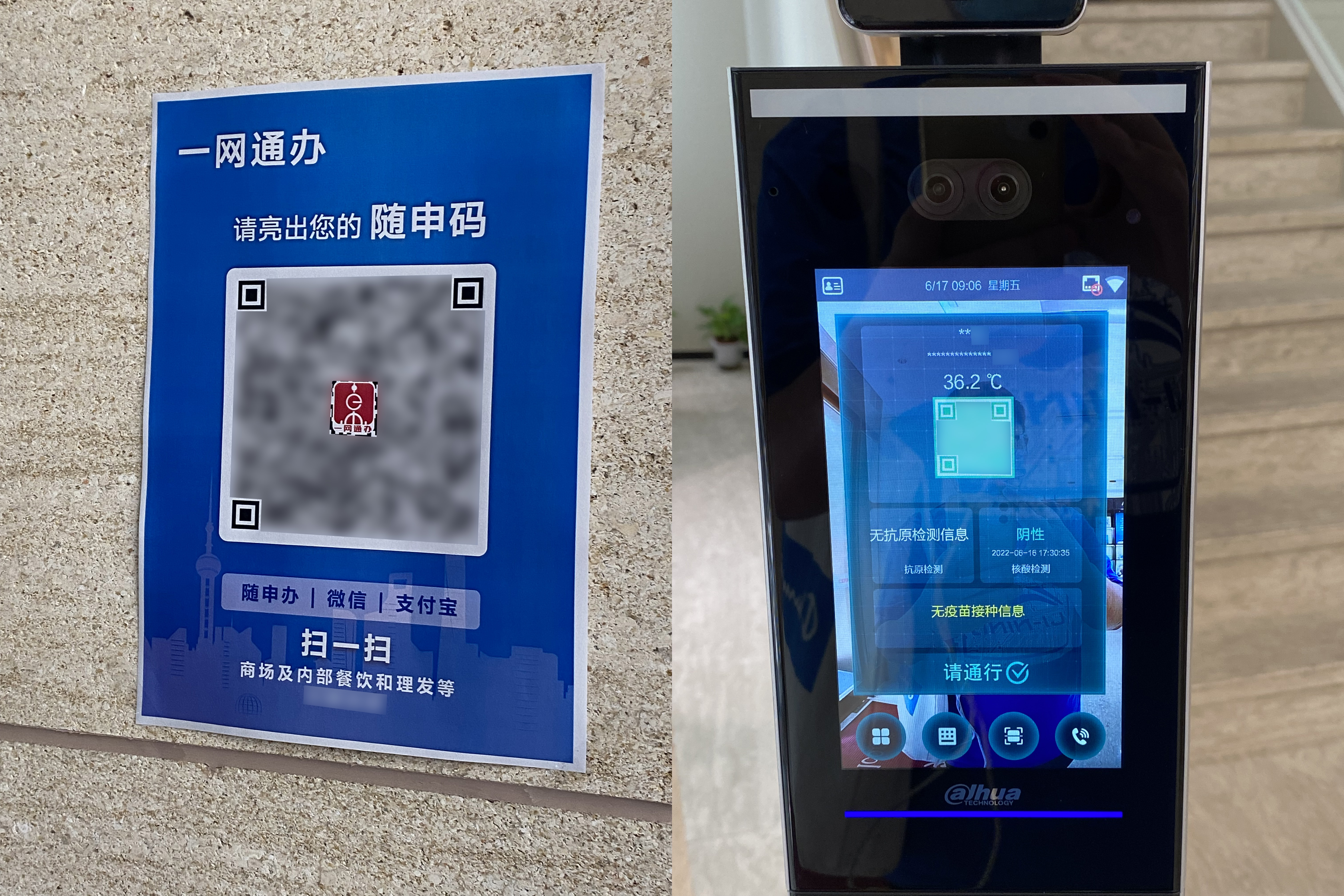
The venue code (left) and digital sentry (right) used in Shanghai, China

The check-in code or the venue code (Chinese: 场所码, Chǎngsuǒgmǎ) is a QR code to record check-in locations for contact tracing and epidemiologic investigations. It was widely used in Australia and China during the COVID-19 pandemic in 2020–2022.

== Mechanism ==
Because of the COVID-19 pandemic, some regulations were made for contact tracing, and then some governments required people to scan a QR code to record their locations of all the places that they have visited. As for the example of the Suzhou venue code, the QR code was generated via WeChat by the asset owner or the landlord, and then the location and the person would be recorded when the QR code scanner scanned this QR code.

== Purposes ==
As all the people scan the QR code when they visit specific locations, their locations and their personal information are recorded. If one of them is infected with COVID-19, people who have visit the same location will be warned, which is convenient for epidemiologic investigations.

== See also ==
- Health Code
- Hong Kong Health Code
