= Health Codes (Chinese mobile app group) =

Type of applications used during COVID-19 in mainland China

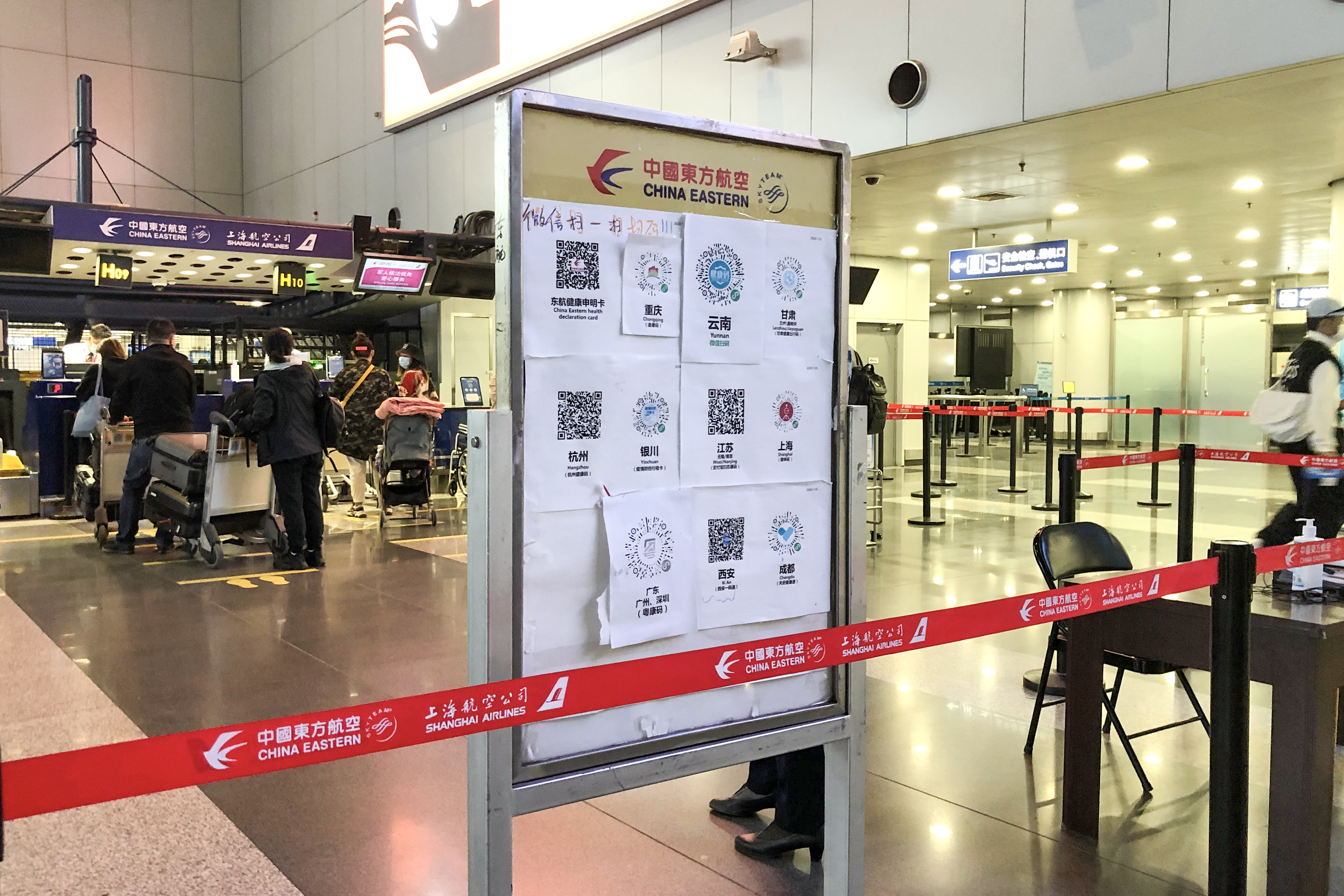
Health Codes prior to Eastern Airlines check-in at Beijing Capital International Airport, 2020

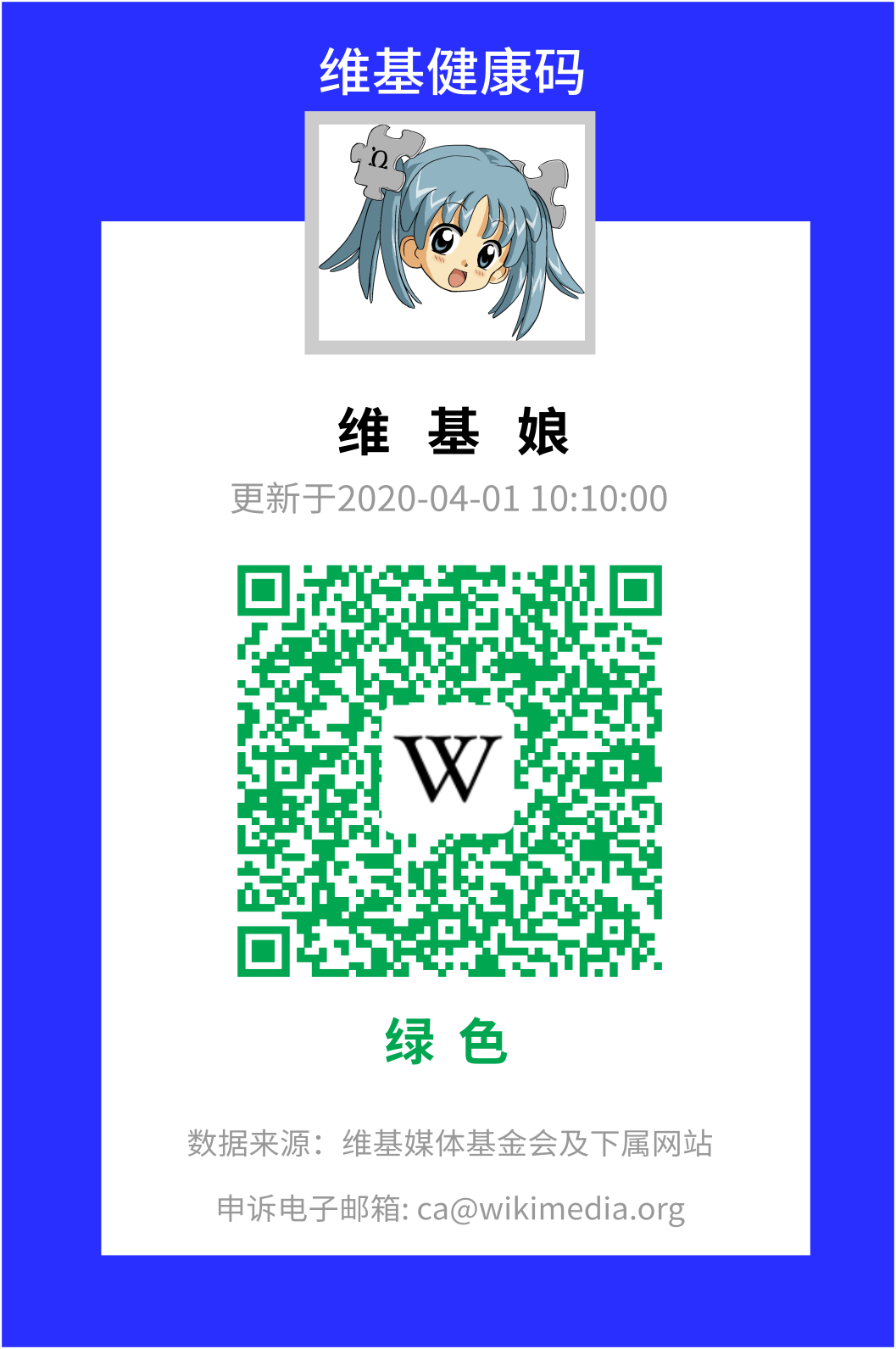
A parody-simulation, in Wikipe-tan style, of a green code of the Health Codes policy enacted in China in response to COVID-19 Pandemic. Citizens are required to fill in surveys in regards to their health situation, travel history, then the platform will issue a color code of either green, yellow or red. Citizens with green codes are free to travel and pass any health checkpoints.

A Health Code (Chinese: 健康码, Jiànkāngmǎ) is a type of application used during COVID-19 in mainland China. It was used as an e-passport that reports if the user has been in an area with current cases of infection. An applicant provides information such as travel history, residence, and medical records. The application will then generate a QR code that identifies the individual's risk level as red, yellow, or green. As of April 2020, over 200 cities and 20 provinces employed health code supported by Alipay. There are a wide range of health codes run by different localities. While many assumed these codes would be phased out after the pandemic, research indicates their continued use and integration beyond the health crisis.

== History ==
On February 7, 2020, the COVID-19 outbreak was reignited when the winter break was over. Zhou Jiangyong, a government officer in Hangzhou, suggested the issuance of a Health Code. On February 9, Shenzhen was the first city to promote Health Code.

On February 11, Alibaba cooperated with Hangzhou city government with devising the application. As of February 15, the coverage enlarged to Hangzhou, Ningbo, Wenzhou, Shaoxing, Jinhua, and other cities in the province.

On May 22, the Hangzhou Municipal Health Commission held a special meeting to promote the normalized use of health codes. It was formulated in the originally collected health codes to integrate electronic medical records, health checkups, and lifestyle management data to compare users' health indicators with the health code colors to build a personal health index ranking.

The predecessor of this program can be traced back to the "Enterprise Employee Health Code", which was developed by DingTalk, a subsidiary of Alibaba that provides support for enterprise employee management. After the Hangzhou Municipal People's Government promoted the restart of the economy and epidemic prevention needs, decided to cooperate with DingTalk, Alipay and other enterprises to develop Hangzhou Health Code. Zheng Rongxin, director of Hangzhou's Data Resources Management Bureau, has said to the public, "Hangzhou Health Code is a simplified version of the corporate employee health code.", and another network enterprise Tencent also almost the same time, put into the development of health code program.

== Procedure ==
=== Application materials and collection ===
Individuals can choose Alipay, WeChat, provincial government service clients or mini programs to declare personal data and receive health codes. Whether they are mainland residents, Hong Kong and Macao residents, Taiwan residents and foreigners, they can complete real-name authentication. Apply for the epidemic prevention health code in Alipay and WeChat, and the data will be connected to the national government platform. After entering the prefecture-level option, the individual will be required to authorize the national government platform to obtain the individual's name, ID number, mobile phone number, and location information. After filling in personal information, health status, travel history, place of residence, and contact with suspected or confirmed virus patients, the program will automatically generate a QR code. In order to facilitate the application of foreigners, some local governments have also introduced the English version of the health code.

Considering that some elderly and children cannot apply for a health code without a smart phone, some places have launched a service to apply for a health code on an agency. According to the local situation, the agent can use the citizen card (a variation of the social security card), printed paper, etc. to verify the code in the relevant scenes, or be presented by the peers. For areas where there is no provision for collection, if special persons need to enter a specific place, they can present an ID card, a paper health certificate, etc. instead of a health code. In addition, in response to the situation that students cannot bring their mobile phones into the school, some areas have developed cards such as "smart education cards". When students enter the school, they can read the card on the machine to determine the health code status.

=== Data and code colors ===
Health codes in various parts of mainland China are led by local governments, and their data comes from the information declared by local big data centers and users themselves, and they are run by algorithms and rules formulated by the government.

The data of personal health code mainly comes from big data; coupled with the function of roaming and positioning across provinces and cities, it can clearly confirm the personal track within 14 days. Personal data includes traffic data, operator data, and financial institution payment data. This is used to achieve accurate and traceable epidemic prevention and control. The health code is divided into three-colors, from least restrictive to most restrictive: green, yellow, and red. However, due to differences in the epidemic situation and prevention and control requirements in various regions, the meanings of the three colors are also different. From a national perspective, green generally means that the person has no abnormalities, is in a healthy state, and can pass normally. Yellow and red indicate that the person is a close contact who needs isolation or medical observation, or is a person from a key country or region of the epidemic and who has been in the corresponding health code for less than 14 days, or a confirmed case of new coronary pneumonia who has not recovered, for which a suspected case has not been ruled out. Patients with fever or asymptomatic infections are not allowed to pass normally. However, some cities require people who have been given red and yellow codes to complete the health check-in continuously before they can be converted to green codes.For example, in Shanghai, anyone who has no evidence of a negative COVID-19 test before March 16 will have a yellow code, and in Beijing, travellers from areas with COVID-19 cases will get a yellow code.

== List of Chinese regional health codes ==
#	Locations	Names of Codes	Multilingual
1	Beijing	The Health Kit Jiankang Bao	English; Mandarin
2	Jilin	Jixiang Ma JiShiBan	Mandarin
3	Tianjin	JinXinBan	English; Mandarin
4	Hebei	Hebei Jiankang Ma	English; Mandarin
5	Shanxi	Shanxi Jiankang Ma	Mandarin
6	Inner Mongolia	Meng Jiankang	Mandarin
7	Liaoning	LiaoShiTong	Mandarin
8	Heilongjiang	Longjiang Jiankang Ma	Mandarin
9	Shanghai	SuiShenBan	English; Mandarin
10	Jiangsu	SuFuBan SuKang Ma	Mandarin
10.1	Wuxi	XiKang Ma	Mandarin
11	Zhejiang	ZheLiBan	Mandarin
11.1	Hangzhou	Hangzhou Jiankang Ma	Mandarin
12	Anhui	WanShiTong ALL IN WAN	Mandarin
13	Fujian	MinZhengTong	Mandarin
14	Jiangxi	GanTongMa	Mandarin
15	Shandong	Jiankang Shandong	Mandarin
16	Henan	YuShiBan	Mandarin
17	Hubei	Hubei Jiankang Ma	Mandarin
17.1	Wuhan Xiangyang	Wuhan ZhanYi	Mandarin
18	Hunan	HunanSheng Jumin Jiankang Ka Resident Health Card of Hunan Province	Mandarin
19	Guangdong	YueKang Ma Guangdong Health Code (GHC)	English; Mandarin
19.1	Guangzhou	SuiKang Ma Guangzhou Health Code	English; Mandarin
19.2	Shenzhen	Shen I Nin I Shenzhen	Mandarin
20	Guangxi	ZhiGuiTong	Mandarin
21	Hainan	HaiYiBan	English Mandarin
22	Chongqing	Chongqing Jiankang Chuxing YiMaTong YuKang Ma	Mandarin
23	Sichuan	Tianfu JiankangTong	English; Mandarin
24	Guizhou	Guizhou Jiankang Ma	Mandarin
25	Yunnan	Yunnan Jiankang Ma	English; Mandarin
26	Tibet	ZangYiTong	Tibetan; Mandarin
27	Shaanxi	Shaanxi Jiankang Ma	Mandarin
28	Gansu	Jiankang Xin Gansu	Mandarin
29	Qinghai	Jiankang Qinghai	Mandarin
30	Ningxia	WoDe Ningxia	Mandarin
31	Xinjiang	Xinjiang Zhengwu Fuwu Xinjiang Government Service	Mandarin
31.1	Kashgar	HeYiXing	Mandarin
32	Bingtuan	Bingtuan Fangyi Jiankang Pingtai	Mandarin
33	Macau	Macau Health Code	English; Cantonese; Mandarin; Portuguese
34	Hong Kong	Hong Kong Health Code (HKHC)	English; Cantonese; Mandarin
35	Taiwan		

== International version ==
Starting April 2020, the Civil Aviation Administration of China and General Administration of Customs required all Chinese citizens and eligible alien visitors taking flights to China to fill out questionnaires (A-1) of the Health Code International Version to obtain a green code to board day by day starting from 14 days before departure and required that it be verified by airline's ground staffs for check-in and boarding. The airline will allow passengers to board based on the status of the Code and other factors. In the event of a typo or error, passengers needed to contact the Global Consular Protection and Service Emergency Hotline of the Ministry of Foreign Affairs of China for background processing.

In July 2020, the Chinese government promulgated the Announcement on the Boarding of Passengers on Flights to China with a Negative Test Certification for the Novel Coronavirus Test, which requires passengers to undergo nucleic acid testing (PCR) to apply for a green Health Code before taking the flight to China. The Health Code International Version added a "PCR code" entry (B-1) on July 27. Passengers will obtain a green health code with the "HS" (PCR testing in Pinyin) mark after uploading a negative PCR COVID test certificate and being reviewed by the embassy or consulate of the country of departure.

At the end of October, requirements for obtaining a green health code were modified, a negative Antibody test (IgM) was added in addition to the existing PCR test, and such COVID tests should be conducted only in the city where the direct-flight to China depart. In January 2021, some Chinese embassies and consulates abroad issued a notice reiterating that international travel to China should meet the principle of "non-essential, non-urgent, no travel", and announced that embassies and consulates will consider the necessity of travel when deciding whether to issue a green code: passengers who "casually visits relatives and friends" may not be able to get the green code for boarding even if they have a negative test report.

== Place code ==
The place code is a proprietary two-dimensional code generated by the health code system for key places, which identifies the location of the place, the name of the place and other information. The automatic registration of information for people entering and leaving the place, while verifying the health information of people entering and leaving the place, facilitating the management of the place. Place code is a proprietary two-dimensional code used by personnel to enter the key places, is an independent identification code generated by the health code system for key places. By scanning the place code, the information of all the people entering and leaving the place can be registered automatically, and the health card status of the people entering and leaving the place at that time will also be displayed.

There are basically three roles of the place code. First, it is convenient for the public to travel. The automated registration of information through the place code for people entering and leaving the place, while verifying the health code status information of people entering and leaving the place; after sweeping the place code, the system will automatically jump to the health status information of the health code, without having to repeat the bright code.

Second, accurate retrospective investigation. In the case of a local epidemic, you can quickly correlate to other people who have scanned the place code through the sweeping records of the newly crowned confirmed cases or close contacts, so as to facilitate the relevant departments to carry out accurate retrospective investigation and avoid the spread of the epidemic.

Third, the protection of personal information. At present, access to places, place managers require the public to carry out manual information registration, compared with manual information registration, the application of the place code can reduce the number of sensitive personal information transmission levels and the number of people handling.

== Criticism ==
=== Invasion of privacy ===
The application can extract a variety of personal data collected by the government, with in-depth and extensive large-scale surveillance. The system used is the same as the official system for tracking "key personnel" (referring to several broad groups of people that the authorities believe are problematic, including Turkic Muslims and drug users), but the difference is that the modification is aimed at people who have close contacts with the virus.

After the launch of the Health Code, a reporter from the New York Times analyzed the code of the Health Code, and found that the system could not only determine whether someone is at risk of infection in real time, but also share user information with public security agencies to monitor their location and health. In this situation, the user's personal information, location and identification code will be sent to the server, which may exist for a long time after the epidemic is over, and then help the government to monitor. Wang Songlian, a researcher at Human Rights Watch in China, believes that the "health code" is "one of the milestones in the history of China's large-scale surveillance". There are also people who believe that personal medical privacy may be improperly abused. Due to the disputes arising from this issue, regional discordant video transmissions and the lack of supporting remedial measures for system failures have also led to a lot of public grievances and disputes. For example, a Hubei native who returned to work in Shanghai was given a red code, and some people's health codes suddenly changed color in front of the station. Shangguan News, a subsidiary of Jiefang Daily, claimed that "the red code for the destination code of Wuhan people leaving the province is the default" is not true. After an individual is assigned a category (color), there is almost no way for review or appeal. In July 2020, the Ministry of Foreign Affairs of the People's Republic of China issued a document stating that "using the epidemic to use big data technology to carry out large-scale surveillance, infringing on citizens' privacy rights" is a fallacy.

The Hangzhou Municipal Health Commission launched a plan on May 22, intending to integrate the original health code with more personal health information, and will build an overall health scoring system for comparison and ranking with different citizens, communities and companies. Once the plan was reported, it caused an uproar on social media. A large number of netizens questioned that the collection of data violated personal privacy and may also lead to discrimination. Some critics pointed out that this was a blind collusion between business and administration, and that it would be a bad example to propose an upgrade of the health code in a model city of e-government.

=== False quarantines of political targets ===
There are several reported cases of people traveling to protests having their Health Code QR codes inexplicably turn red before or during their travel, and evidence was found suggesting that this was intentionally done to stifle their ability to protest. A red QR code will result in them being quarantined and unable to travel, for example, by being placed at home and having a seal placed on their door.

=== Information leak ===
At the end of December 2020, "Beijing Healthbao" (Beijing's Health Code, 北京健康宝) was exposed to a personal information leakage incident. Its photos, ID card numbers and related nucleic acid test information were put on the Internet for sale, including 7 people from the 3 yuan package "Times Youth League" Health treasure photos, 2 yuan to pack more than 70 artist health treasure photos, and 1 yuan to sell more than 1,000 artist ID numbers and so on. For the group that first appeared in the industry of celebrity "sales", the relevant trading transactions only need to register their personal information in the "Beijing Healthbao" applet, and go through the "Inquiry of Other People's Nucleic Acid Test Results" in the "Health Service Appointment Inquiry". Enter the celebrity's name and ID number, and you can get the health treasure photos of the celebrity without recognizing the face, and even get the person's test result, test agency, and test time. Later, the media verified that some of the celebrities' information was true. And a publicist of Beijing Zhongguancun Science City Urban Brain Company, which is responsible for the development of Beijing Healthbao, said that the company is following up on the incident and relevant information will be announced in time.

=== System omissions and failures ===
At the beginning of the release of the health code, there were multiple system omissions, including the inability to modify personal information, and automatically log in to 37 degrees of body temperature. In addition, the communication big data itinerary card used to assist the use of the health code and confirm the itinerary within 14 days also has the problem of overlapping signals near the provincial border, so that it shows that you have visited a neighboring province without leaving the province. According to VOA reports, Taiwan's artificial intelligence, machine deep learning expert, and associate professor of electrical engineering at National Tsinghua University, Li Qi, believes that the health code is used in special situations and involves sensitive issues such as the spread of the epidemic or groups at high risk of infection. If AI technology is added in the data process, and the decision makers set indicators and integrate data training, and then mark the users layer by layer, it can not only avoid privacy concerns, accurately analyze and judge the situation of the people, and it can also be better for experts to prevent epidemics.

On the morning of May 6, 2020 (the first working day after the May 1st, the Labor Day holiday), a large-scale failure of the Hangzhou Health Code occurred. Subsequently, the Hangzhou Health Code Work Class stated that this was caused by an unstable interface. In addition, there have been similar failures in Beijing, Jiangsu and other places, also caused by interface problems.

The Health Code may also be faked in places where only visual inspection (as opposed to actually scanning the QR code) is performed. In May 2022, a Zhouzhuang truck driver was arrested in Jiangyin and accused of criminally interfering with pandemic prevention (妨害传染病防治罪). This man hid his "yellow" code to ship goods and refuel in the town. A positive routine PCR test prompted the authorities to check his movements.

=== Misuse as movement control ===
There have been concerns that the code may be abused by the authorities to restrict access to public services and movement for reasons other than pandemic control. In June 2022, the concern turned into reality as 1,317 people – a mixture of depositors of recently bankrupt rural banks in Henan and owners of unfinished apartments freshly abandoned – found their Health Code turned red, preventing them from traveling to Zhengzhou and attending a protest. In response, one protester said "They are putting digital handcuffs on us." Three officials were punished by the party: one stripped of party credentials and two given demerits. No charges have been filed.

Similar incidents have happened earlier but involved no official response. In December 2021, a human rights lawyer called Xie Yang tried to travel to Shanghai to visit a dissident's mother despite authorities' warnings. He found his code turned red at the airport despite no recent travel, was stopped by security, tried to resist quarantine and failed. In January 2022, he was put under arrest for two criminal charges of inciting subversion and provoking trouble.

=== Personal health evaluation ===
The Hangzhou government is actively exploring additional services on the health code, such as medical visits and scenic reservations. in May 2020, the Hangzhou government plans to make the health code permanent and try to introduce a personal health evaluation system. Based on the health score, the color of the health code fades from green to red instead of the usual green, yellow, and red colors. Factors that affect the health score include exercise, alcohol consumption, smoking and sleep. For example, drinking 200 ml of alcohol leads to a 1.5-point drop in health score, smoking 5 cigarettes leads to a 3-point drop in health score; if walking reaches 15,000 steps, the score goes up significantly by 5 points. In addition, the health score will be linked to many groups such as businesses, buildings, and communities to arrive at a total score. The personal health evaluation makes Hangzhou's smart city construction "a code first", and also ensures that the public "can't get enough of the health code". However, netizens and experts have questioned that the health code violates personal privacy and may lead to discrimination.

=== Guizhou COVID-19 isolated bus overturning accident ===
Health codes give people a sense of security and a better visualization of each other's health. However, for Western countries, health codes are considered more of an infringement of personal privacy, which reveals not only private health but also personal orientation. The existence of health codes is also considered to be a government management tool. In Asian countries, especially in China, collectivism and community spirit are respected, from the national level to the family. But mandatory health codes, quarantine, and vaccinations are against the liberalism and human rights favored by Western countries. For example, in the Guizhou bus overturning incident in 2020.

Due to the red color of the health code, the government will immediately be able to locate the specific person involved in the disease and enforce a group quarantine. A bus accident that caused 27 deaths and injured another 20 victims in southwestern China's Guizhou province was carried in the government's Guiyang City quarantine transfer vehicle for people involved in the disease, transporting people to the COVID-19 quarantine site, local media reported Sunday. The bus accident quickly became a trending topic on China's Twitter-like Weibo account on Sunday afternoon, before it disappeared from the top 50 trending topics shortly thereafter. At least some of the widely circulated and angry blogs were removed from WeChat shortly after they were posted, but some reports and comments initially remained, although much of the more critical content was removed from Weibo.

== See also ==
- LeaveHomeSafe, the equivalent app in Hong Kong
- Hong Kong Health Code
