= COVID-19 pandemic in Tianjin =

- Disease: COVID-19
- Pathogen: SARS-CoV-2
- Location: Tianjin, China
- First outbreak: Wuhan, Hubei
- Arrival date: 2020
- Confirmed cases: 962
- Recovered: 567
- Deaths: 3

The COVID-19 pandemic reached the municipality of Tianjin, China, in January 2020.

== Statistics ==
Division	Active	Confirmed	Deceased	Recovered
Tianjin		962	3	567
Jinnan District	292	0	2	
Baodi District	2			
Xiqing District	0			
Hedong District, Tianjin	1			
Binhai	0			
Hebei District	0			
Hexi District, Tianjin	0			
Nankai District	0			
Beichen District	0			
Heping District, Tianjin	0			
Dongli District	0			
Ninghe District	0			
Hongqiao District	0			
Wuqing District	0			

== 2020 ==
On January 21, 2020, 2 confirmed cases were reported. A 60-year-old woman and a 58-year-old man were quarantined after returning to Tianjin from Wuhan on January 19 and January 14.

At 12 o'clock on January 22, two new confirmed cases were reported, both of whom had received isolation treatment in designated hospitals, and their vital signs were stable. Among the patients, there was one female, 67 years old, and one male, 40 years old, both of whom had a work history in Wuhan.

On January 24, the Tianjin Center for Disease Control and Prevention announced two confirmed cases. The patient was an employee of the crew workshop of the Tianjin High-speed Train Passenger Transport Section and was a colleague of one of the patients who was diagnosed on January 21. On the same day, the Tianjin Municipal Health Commission reported a new confirmed case of pneumonia caused by a new type of coronavirus infection. The patient was a 46-year-old male patient.

On January 25, the Tianjin Municipal Health and Health Commission announced three new cases, one new case, and one confirmed case three times. As of the afternoon of January 25, a total of 10 cases of pneumonia caused by the new coronavirus infection had been found in Tianjin, including 7 males and 3 females; 7 severe cases and 3 mild cases; no critical cases.

On January 26, the Tianjin Municipal Health Commission announced that there were 3 new confirmed cases of pneumonia caused by a new type of coronavirus infection.

== 2021 ==
On January 1, 2021, Tianjin added 3 new confirmed cases of imported new coronary pneumonia.

== 2022 ==
On January 1, 5 new confirmed cases of imported new coronary pneumonia were reported in Tianjin.
