= Airfinity =

Data and analytics company

Airfinity Ltd
- Type: Private company
- Industry: Data and analytics (health)
- Founded: 2015
- Founders: Rasmus Bech Hansen, Sacha Carton
- Headquarters: London, United Kingdom
- Website: www.airfinity.com

Airfinity Ltd is a UK-based data and analytics company. It specialises in monitoring and forecasting trends in the global disease and public health industries.

== History ==
Airfinity was co-founded in 2015 by Rasmus Bech Hansen and Sacha Carton and is one of the 515 companies in which the UK government's Future Fund retains equity.

In 2020, the company became one of the most quoted data companies in the media for its COVID-19 reports, having been described as doing "the best modelling of the pandemic data" by professor Sir John Bell.

In July 2022, Airfinity's analysis on COVID-19 vaccines estimated AstraZeneca's vaccine Vaxzevria saved 6.3m lives worldwide in its first year of usage and Pfizer/BioNTech's Comirnarty saved 5.9 million lives in the same time period.

On 25 December 2022, the Chinese Center for Disease Control and Prevention announced it would no longer be sharing data on COVID-19 infections. After this, Airfinity became the leading source of COVID-19 infection and death estimates in China.

Based on regional modelling, Airfinity estimated between 1.3 and 2.1 million people would die in the first wave of infections. The firm's epidemiological forecast predicted cases would peak at 4.8 million a day and deaths would peak at 9,000 a day.

In April 2023, The Rhodes Trust hosted a policy summit where experts discussed learnings from the pandemic. Speakers included Sir John Bell, Sir Tony Blair, George Fu Gao, Richard Hatchett, and Andrew Pollard. During the summit, Airfinity's CEO Rasmus Bech Hansen presented the company's forecast on the likelihood of another pandemic, which suggested that there was a 27.5% of a COVID-like pandemic occurring in the next decade.
