= COVID-19 pandemic in Shaanxi =

- Disease: COVID-19
- Pathogen: SARS-CoV-2
- Location: Shaanxi, China
- First outbreak: Wuhan, Hubei
- Arrival date: 2020
- Active cases: 2,826
- Recovered: 2,823
- Deaths: 3

The COVID-19 pandemic reached the province of Shaanxi, China.

== Statistics ==
Division	Active	Confirmed	Deceased	Recovered
Shaanxi	0	2,826	3	2,823
Xi'an	0	2,187	3	2,184
Tongchuan	0	10	0	8
Baoji	0	13	0	13
Xianyang	0	32	0	32
Weinan	0	18	0	18
Yan'an	0	21	0	21
Hanzhong	0	26	0	26
Yulin, Shaanxi	0	10	0	3
Ankang	0	26	0	26
Shangluo	0	10	0	7
Yangling Agricultural Hi-tech Industries Demonstration Zone	0	1	0	1
Hancheng	0	1	0	1
Xingping				
Binzhou, Shaanxi				
Overseas import personnel	0	483	0	483

== Timeline ==
=== 2020 ===
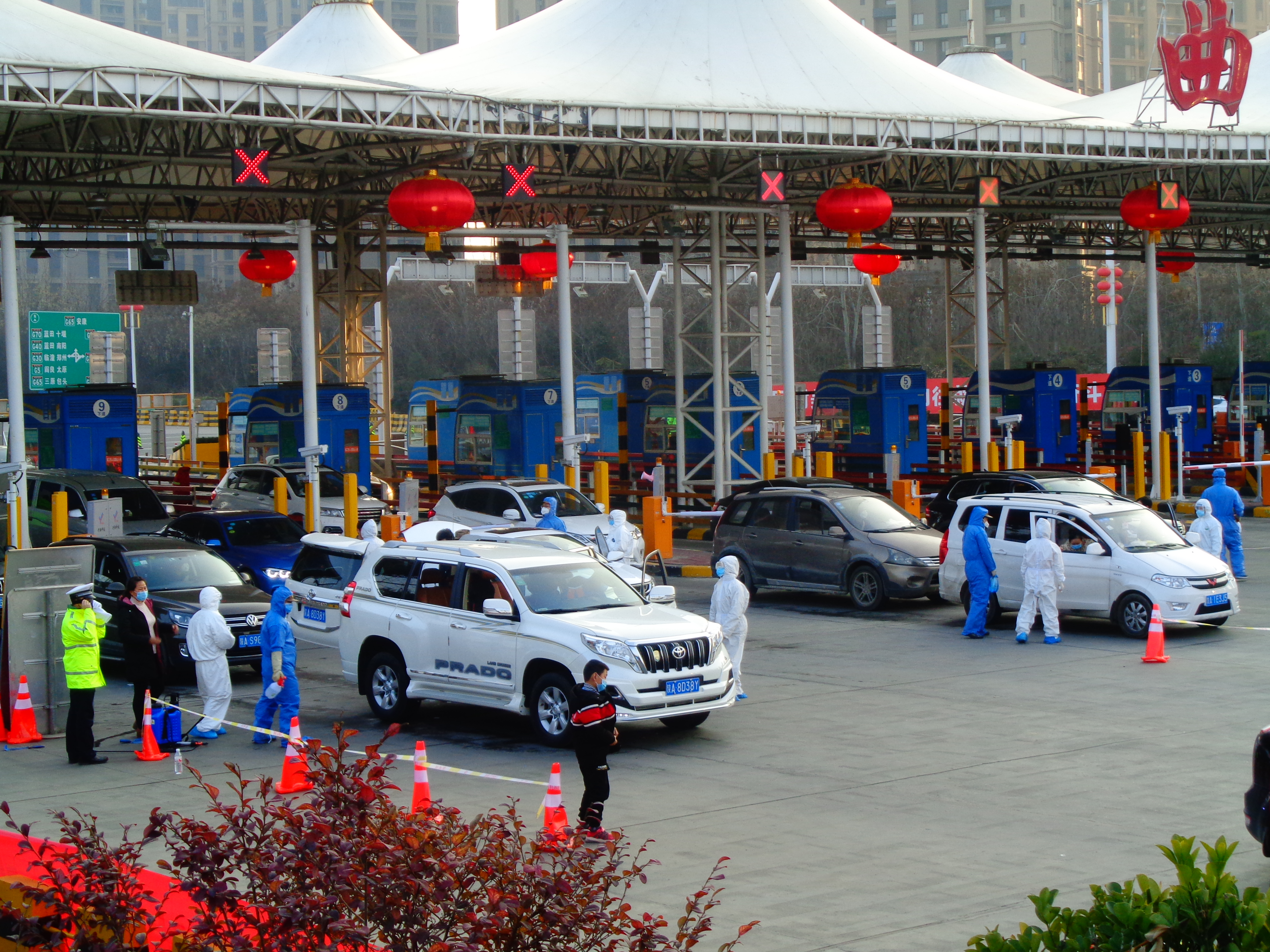
Epidemiological inspection at Qujiang Toll Station of G3002 Xi'an Ring Expressway, Yanta District, Xi'an City, 30 January 2020

On the evening of January 24, the Shaanxi Provincial Health Committee reported that there were 2 new confirmed cases of pneumonia caused by a new type of coronavirus in Shaanxi, including 1 in Ankang City and 1 in Yan'an City.

On January 25, Shaanxi Province reported 10 new cases. One of the patients was a 9-year-old girl from Wuhan. She visited relatives in Tongchuan City on Monday. She developed symptoms the next day and went to the hospital for medical treatment after self-medication was ineffective. She is currently in the local infectious disease hospital. Isolation treatment, stable condition.

On January 27, Shaanxi Province notified 13 new confirmed cases of new pneumonia and 2 new severe patients.

On January 28, Shaanxi Province reported 11 new confirmed cases of new pneumonia. Among the newly confirmed cases, there were 3 cases in Xi'an City, 3 cases in Baoji City, 2 cases in Weinan City, 1 case in Hanzhong City, 1 case in Ankang City, and 1 case in Shangluo City. 1 case.

On January 29, Shaanxi Province reported 10 new confirmed cases of new pneumonia. Among the newly confirmed cases, there were 3 cases in Xi'an City, 1 case in Baoji City, 1 case in Xianyang City, 1 case in Yan'an City, 2 cases in Hanzhong City, and 2 cases in Ankang City. 2 cases.

On January 30, Shaanxi Province reported 7 new confirmed cases of new pneumonia and 1 new severe patient. Among the newly confirmed cases, 4 were in Xi'an, 1 in Weinan, 1 in Yulin, and 1 in Hancheng.

On January 31, Shaanxi Province notified 24 new confirmed cases of new pneumonia. Among the newly confirmed cases, 10 were in Xi'an, 1 in Xianyang, 1 in Weinan, 4 in Yan'an, 5 in Hanzhong, and 3 in Ankang.

=== 2021 ===
On January 1, 1 newly imported confirmed case was reported (from Spain).

=== 2022 ===
On January 1, 123 local confirmed cases were newly reported in Shaanxi Province (122 in Xi'an City, 1 in Yan'an City), and 1 case was cured and discharged.
