= Hong Kong Health Code =

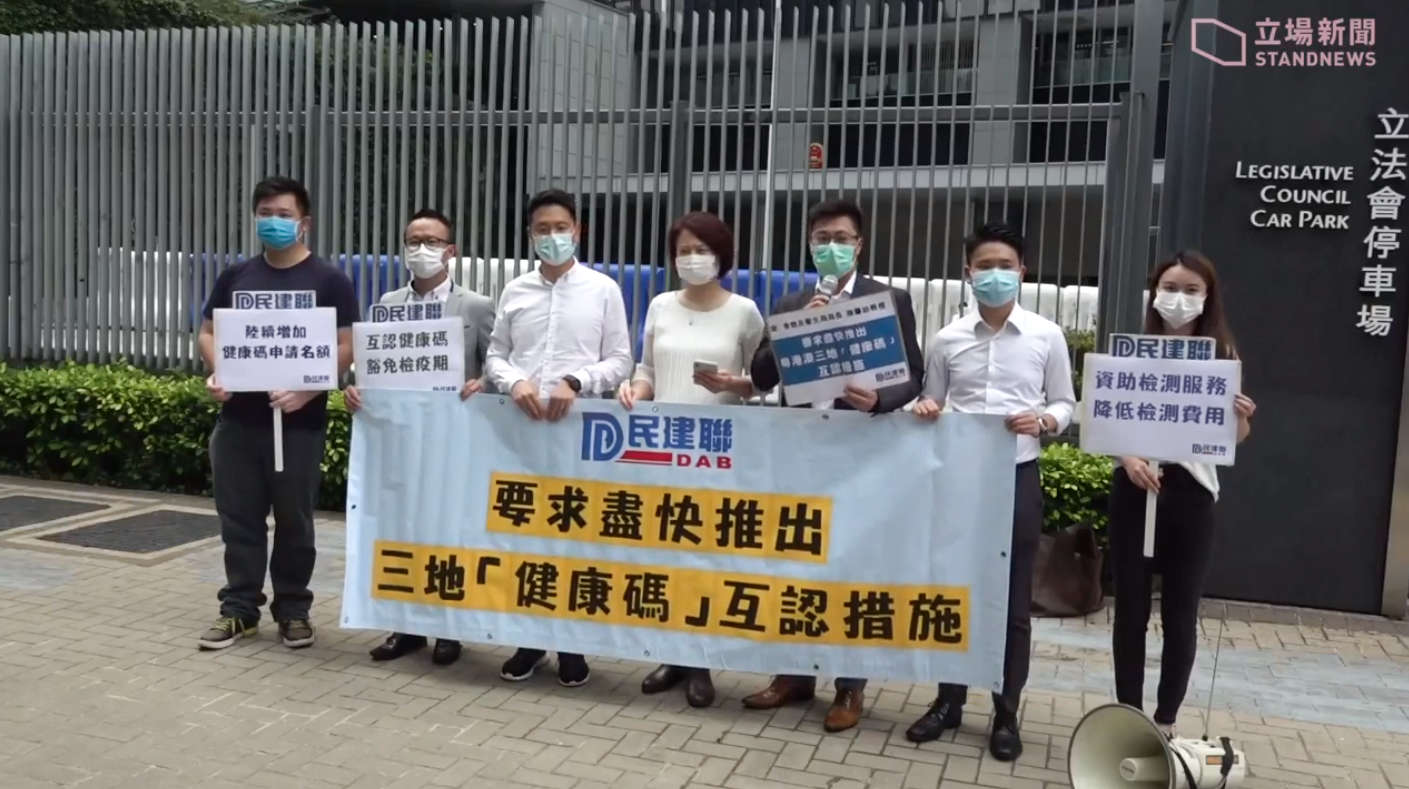

Hong Kong Health Code (Chinese: 香港健康碼) is an online system established on 10 December 2021 for qualified individuals to transfer their personal data including negative nucleic acid test result and vaccination records to the computer system of the Guangdong Health Code or Macao Health Code to facilitate health declaration upon entry to Guangdong or Macao.

== History and Developments ==
In May 2020, Pak-Leung Ho, a Clinical Associate Professor at the University of Hong Kong, suggested that the Guangdong‑Hong Kong‑Macau Area was ready for a more lenient border control policy. He also suggested that the Hong Kong government could introduce a “health code” policy to replace the existing quarantine procedure, which was already implemented in Macau and part of mainland China. The proposed health code mobile app would include the users’ nucleic acid test results so that travelers would not have to present hard copies of their test results.

On 11 June 2020, the Hong Kong government disclosed that it would soon announce the details of a mutual recognition system for health codes of Guangdong, Hong Kong, and Macao, intending to restore the traffic between the three regions. It also stated that the government of the three regions were discussing the details and had nearly come to an agreement, and that the details may be announced in as soon as a week if the epidemic remains stable. However, the announcement of the scheme was later postponed, reportedly to 27 June or 28 June. It was also reported that the scheme may be adjusted to be initially between Hong Kong and Guangdong only, and that Macau would only be included in the scheme at a later stage if the scheme is successful. However, the policy was further postponed to August as the epidemic in Hong Kong deteriorated in July.

At a press conference held on 21 August, the Chief Executive Carrie Lam stated that the health code policy will be implemented after the epidemic in Hong Kong stabilizes, but its usage will be limited to border control only and will be without any tracking functions. It was suggested by some pro-establishment parties that all citizens should be required to show their health codes before entering a restaurant, to which Carrie Lam has criticized for being impractical.

== Opinions in the year 2020 ==
=== Pro-establishment parties ===
On 9 August 2020, multiple pro-establishment parties including the DAB, the BPA, the HKFTU, and the NPP held a joint press conference and urged the government to implement a mutual recognition system for health codes in the Greater Bay Area. The BPA further suggested that citizens without a health code should be prohibited from entering public spaces such as restaurants or malls.

=== Medical Industry ===
The pulmonologist Chi-Chiu Leung commented that the health code policy “lacks any scientific evidence” as an epidemic preventive measure, since there was no successful precedent and that it was contrary to epidemiological analysis. As COVID-19 has a quite fluid incubation period, citizens may test negative falsely and as a result travel to multiple locations before any symptoms appear, effectively becoming a superspreader. Thus the health code policy may actually impair the effort against the epidemic. He also opined that in order for the society to resume normal activities, the government should instead focus on controlling this wave of the epidemic while preventing more imported cases.

The President of the Hong Kong Medical Association Kin Choi stated that the users must be tested at least weekly in order for the health code policy to be effective, as otherwise it cannot be guaranteed that the users are truly negative for COVID-19. He further pointed out that without proper support, the health code scheme will just be "an activity exclusive to the wealthy".

Ivan Law, the vice-chairperson of the HA Employees Alliance, pointed out that an app that allows the government to record every place a citizen has been will be controversial, even in a democratic society.

Winnie Yu, the chairperson of the HA Employee Alliance, criticized the government for allowing certain categories of travelers to be exempted from quarantine after entering Hong Kong. As long as the government refuses to completely shut down the border, it is impossible to quench the epidemic from its source. She further pointed out that the social gathering ban and the health code scheme were not epidemic prevention policies, but were in truth political agendas to restrict the citizen's freedom.

=== Catering Industry ===
Gordon Lam, convenor at the Hong Kong Small and Medium Restaurant Federation, criticized the government for having its head in the clouds. Gordon pointed out that if a customer was falsely convinced by his/her health code that he/she was free of the virus, it could lead to a new wave of the epidemic. He alternatively suggested that closing the border was the best measure to combat the epidemic.

=== Information Technology Industry ===
Wong Ho-wa, an Election Committee member representing the IT industry, once expressed his concern that the health code policy will over-collect personal data. There were multiple doubts regarding the policy that the Hong Kong government has not yet cleared up, including the question of how the governments of Hong Kong, Macau, and Guangdong will utilize the data, and if there will be a data retention period. There was also the concern that citizen's data would lose the protection by the Personal Data (Privacy) Ordinance as the data will be transferred to mainland China.

Alex Tang, the chairperson of the Hong Kong Information Technology Workers’ Union, pointed out that the health code scheme will effectively force Hong Kong citizens to transfer their personal data to mainland China.

=== Human rights organizations ===
The director of the Hong Kong Human Rights Monitor Law Yuk Kai pointed out that if the health code policy is implemented in Hong Kong, it will allow the government to classify citizens into different categories and limit some of them from using certain governmental services, effectively implementing a social credit system similar to that in mainland China.
