= Rightful resistance =

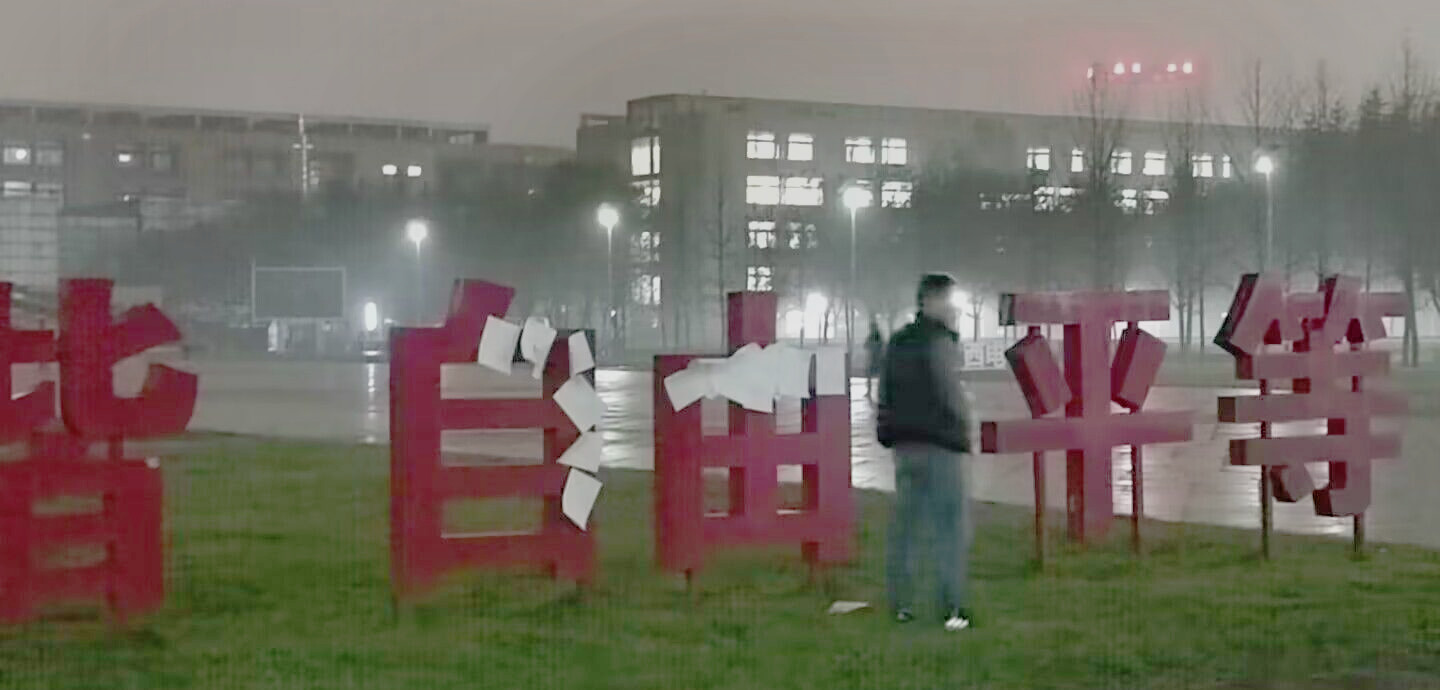
Blank pieces of paper stuck to the characters "自由" ("Freedom"), part of the Core Socialist Values slogan board at Xidian University in November 2022

Rightful resistance is a form of partially institutionalized popular contention against the state whereby aggrieved citizens seek to legitimize their causes by making use of state's own laws, policies or rhetoric in framing their protests. Rightful resistance is contrasted with other forms of popular protest where citizens challenge the legitimacy of rulers; the rightful resister accepts the legitimacy of laws, policies and core values of the state, but protests when they perceive that authorities have failed to deliver on their own promises, or have defied the laws or widely accepted values. Rightful resisters are characterized by the peaceful nature of their protests, which often make use of institutionalized channels of dissent. Unlike more conventional resisters who may employ covert or quiet means of sabotage against the state, rightful resisters actively seek the attention of the elites, and their protests are public and open.

The concept was first explained by the political scientist Kevin O'Brien in the 1996 article Rightful Resistance, which focused on its applications in rural China, as well as in a variety of other political settings, including the United States and South Africa. The concept was elaborated on in O'Brien and Lianjiang Li's 2006 book Rightful Resistance in Rural China, and has been adopted by a number of other social change theorists to describe the methods by which citizens may gradually seek to advance their rights and interests.

== Examples of rightful resistance ==
=== China ===
The concept of rightful resistance was initially used to describe protest actions adopted in rural China, where citizens confront a range of grievances stemming from official corruption, environmental pollution, predatory taxes, and economic misappropriation, among others. As the "rights consciousness" of Chinese citizens grew in the era of Deng Xiaoping and onward, citizens began making use of petitioning channels, the legal system, and of central government directives to hold local-level authorities to account. To illustrate, O'Brien provides the example of a group of villagers in Henan province facing excessive taxes from local authorities. In response, the villages presented authorities with a copy of central government regulations which prescribed strict limits of taxes, and threatened that if the local authorities failed to drop the excessive taxes, they would take their complaints up the ladder.

Rightful resistance in China can also manifests in a variety of other ways, include use of the petitioning system, village elections, and legal system to seek redress against grievances. Weiquan (rights defending) lawyers, who regularly defy authorities by defending individuals whose human or civil rights have been violated by the party-state, have been described as engaging in a form of rightful resistance. Weiquan lawyers typically frame their arguments by making appeals to China's constitution, arguing that abuses of human rights—sanctioned as they may be by the state—are in contravention of the country's laws.
