= Zhengzhou Foxconn protests =

2022 protests in China

Zhengzhou Foxconn Protests
- Part of 2022 COVID-19 protests in China
- Date: November 22, 2022
- Location: Zhengzhou Airport Economy Zone, Zhengzhou, Henan, China
- Caused by: Foxconn Technology Group's breach of contract
- Goals: Foxconn Technology Group Revokes Breach of Contract
- Methods: Political demonstrations, strikes, riots
- Result: Successful Worker Rights Protection Foxconn Technology Group has issued an apology letter and a public relations letter promising that the commission will match the original contract Government funded, Foxconn Technology Group promises to provide severance pay of 10000 RMB to departing employees

Parties
People's Government of Henan Province; Zhengzhou Municipal People's Government; Foxconn Technology Group	Zhengzhou Foxconn Factory worker

Lead figures
People's Government of Henan Province	No centralized leadership

The Zhengzhou Foxconn protests, officially referred to by Foxconn Technology Group as the "Zhengzhou Mass Gathering Incident", began in November 2022. These protests, strikes, and violent clashes were initiated and participated in by some employees at the Zhengzhou factory in Henan Province, China, a subsidiary of Foxconn Technology Group (known as Foxconn in mainland China), in response to Foxconn Technology Group's breach of contract and the Chinese government's "dynamic zero-COVID" policy.

== Background ==
In the early 21st century, accusations emerged that Foxconn Technology Group's operations in mainland China fit the definition of a "sweatshop". These accusations included militarized and high-pressure management and excessive overtime. Since 2009, several employees have committed suicide due to job-related stress. Guo Jun, a secretary of the All-China Federation of Trade Unions and head of its Legal Work Department, criticized Foxconn's illegal overtime practices in his report on ten significant illegal labor cases and labor incidents in China in 2014. In response to these accusations, former chairman and founder of Foxconn Technology Group, Terry Gou, stated:

What's wrong with sweatshops? We bleed and sweat, but as long as we comply with the law, we believe that hard work pays off

— Terry Gou, On April 28, 2012, Terry Gou responded to external questioning of allegations against sweatshops.

The labor rights dispute in Zhengzhou originated in early October 2022, when the local government in Zhengzhou implemented a "dynamic zero-COVID" policy to combat the COVID-19 outbreak, affecting Foxconn employees. Rumors spread that the outbreak had reached the Foxconn factory, with reports of sick employees working and worsening living conditions. Videos circulated online showing a significant number of Foxconn employees walking home. Although the Henan provincial government later arranged transportation for returning Foxconn employees, the Zhengzhou government was criticized by the State Council's Joint Prevention and Control Mechanism for its arbitrary use of "silent periods" and lockdowns instead of proper control measures on November 5.

== Protests ==
The mass resignation wave caused by the strict anti-epidemic measures left a large number of vacancies at Foxconn, prompting the company to issue recruitment notices to fill the gaps. The Henan provincial government also encouraged local residents, including veterans, to apply for jobs at Foxconn. However, employees accused Foxconn of hiring at high wages but later offering new contracts at basic salaries. Furthermore, due to the government's stringent zero-COVID policy, employees could not leave the factory at will, leading to protests against Foxconn and the local government.

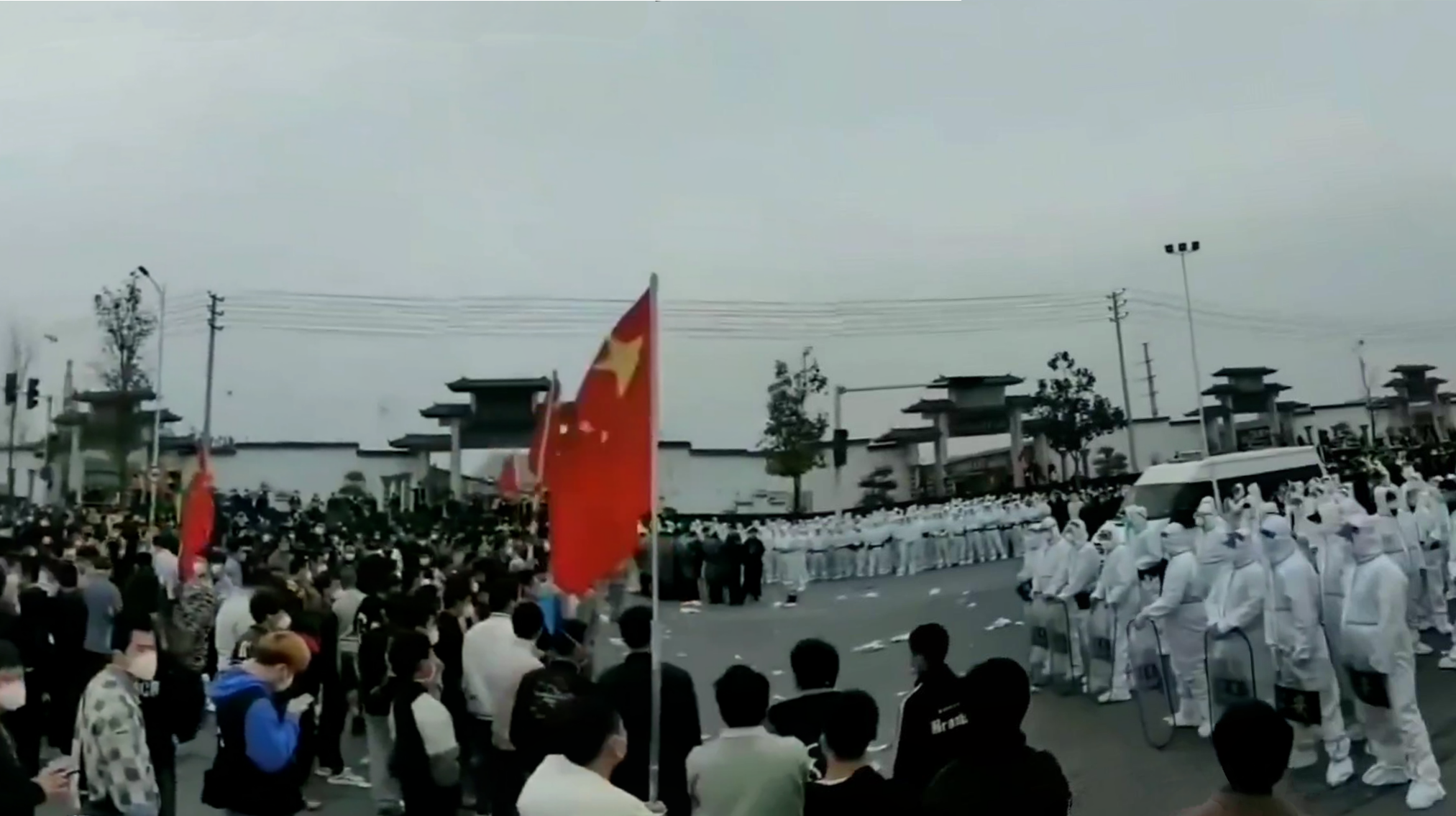
Zhengzhou Foxconn workers protest

Reports indicated violent clashes between Foxconn employees and government personnel, including police and health workers in hazmat suits. Social media platforms like Twitter showed videos of employees using folding chairs to smash COVID-19 testing stations and using sticks to fend off police barricades. In response to inadequate local control measures, the Henan provincial government dispatched additional police forces from neighboring cities like Luoyang. The New York Times, BBC, Reuters, and other media widely covered the incident, with some calling it the largest anti-government protest since 1989. Foxconn later issued a statement conceding to workers' demands, which eased the situation.

== Responses ==
On November 25, Foxconn Technology Group issued a statement apologizing for the discrepancy between the promised and actual wages, attributing it to a "technical error" by internal staff, and assured that all salary policies matched the official recruitment advertisements.

== Follow-Up Developments ==
In early November, Terry Gou wrote to General Secretary of the Chinese Communist Party Xi Jinping, which facilitated the introduction of the "Twenty Measures" on November 11 to ease the zero-COVID policy. On November 25, the Zhengzhou government organized buses to transport hundreds of Foxconn employees to Xuzhou. Some employees left independently upon arrival, their whereabouts unknown. Meanwhile, Henan also transported some stranded personnel to Jiangsu by train. The next day, the Xuzhou COVID-19 Epidemic Joint Prevention and Control Command issued a statement clarifying that the transportation was uncoordinated and that employees were allowed to leave Xuzhou voluntarily.

Despite the announcement of the Twenty Measures, local governments did not implement the provisions but instead adopted stricter control measures. This approach directly led to large-scale protests and demonstrations nationwide following the Ürümqi fire on November 24, ultimately prompting the central government to ease restrictions. On December 7, the new "Ten Measures" were issued, ending the three-year zero-COVID policy.

== See also ==
- 2022 COVID-19 protests in China
