= 24th anniversary of the 1989 Tiananmen Square protests and massacre =

24th anniversary of Tiananmen Square protests of 1989
- Date: 4 June 2013
- Location: Hong Kong
- Participants: general public
- Outcome: protest march, candlelight vigil

The 24th anniversary of Tiananmen Square protests of 1989 took place in China and internationally around 4 June 2013. The protests commemorated victims of the Chinese Communist Party crackdown on the Tiananmen Square protests of 1989. Activities included the state of alert within mainland China, and the traditional marches and candlelight vigils that took place in Hong Kong and Macau on 4 June 2013 which have taken place every year prior to that since 1990. The two former colonies are the only places on Chinese soil where the 1989 crushing of China's pro-democracy movement can be commemorated.

In 2013, more than 150,000 participants braved the torrential rains in Hong Kong and Macau to remember the 1989 student protest movement, according to organisers; police estimated the turnout to be 54,000. There was a similar vigil in the Taiwanese capital.

In the run-up, the authorities in the People's Republic of China detained and silenced dissidents as in previous years. Families who had hoped to observe the day mourning those who died were intimidated. Policing was stepped up to ensure that no protests took place in or around Tiananmen Square. The Great Firewall was at work blocking sites or removing any references and images that refer to or even hint at the upheavals of 1989.

== Background ==
In the context of democratic development in Hong Kong, Qiao Xiaoyang, who chairs the Law Committee of the National People's Congress Standing Committee, caused howls of protest from the pan-democrats when he stated on 24 March 2013 that chief executive "candidates must be persons who love the country and love Hong Kong". He admitted that it would be difficult to define, but implied that the pan-democrats were unpatriotic, he said: "As long as they insist on confronting the central government, they cannot become the chief executive."

== Inside mainland China ==
In the run-up, the authorities in the People's Republic of China detained and silenced dissidents as in previous years. Families who had hoped to observe the day mourning those who died were intimidated. Policing was stepped up to ensure that no protests took place in or around Tiananmen Square. The Great Firewall was at work blocking sites or removing any references and images that refer to or even hint at the upheavals of 1989. The South China Morning Post quoted a report in Canyu saying that at least 52 human rights activists, dissidents and intellectuals had been detained in their homes or elsewhere on 4 June, including 11 in Shandong, 9 in Beijing, and 7 in Guangzhou. Despite her being under house arrest since her brother's "suicide" a year earlier, Li Wangling managed to sneak an interview with iCable in which she thanked the people of Hong Kong for their support. Other friends of Li have been put under tight surveillance.

=== Beijing city centre ===
On the anniversary date, guards with red armbands were stationed every 100 metres on Chang'an Avenue. A team from Hong Kong media who attempted to film the morning flag-raising in Tiananmen Square was prevented from doing so. They were held for an hour in a "routine check" and ordered to delete their footage shot. They were released after the ceremony had ended. At the Wanan cemetery, where some of those who died in the crackdown are buried, officers closed off the main gate. Mourners were redirected to a side gate, but the media were prevented from going in. Muxidi, entry point for the first troops in 1989, was off-limits to any gathering. Tiananmen Mothers leader Ding Zilin has been banned from visiting her son's grave. Her telephone lines and internet connections were interrupted. Ding remarked that "the arrangements for some of us to remember our sons and daughters was more reasonable than in past years, the overall surveillance is tighter". AFP reported that there were "security personnel" stationed outside the house of former Chinese Communist Party general secretary Zhao Ziyang.

=== Censorship ===
Tank Man meets Rubber Duck

In mainland China, where any mention of the event is taboo, the blogs and social media on internet in China were in the forefront of the battle with censors. Censors blocked keywords such as Tiananmen and candle. 4 June and even common circumstantial items such as tomorrow, today, tonight were blocked in the run-up to the anniversary. 35 May, which used to pass under the radar, no longer works. Sina Weibo also banished its candle emoticon for bloggers.

Use of internet memes have become the favourite way of circumventing censorship. Following the appearance in a parody of "Tank Man" on Sina Weibo inspired by The Rubber Duck Project that took Hong Kong by storm, the term big yellow duck was also blocked. Another one that briefly got through censorship under cover of International Children's Day was a reconstruction of "Tank Man" using LEGO bricks on NetEase.

On 31 May 2013 Chinese authorities once again started blocking access to the https version of the Wikipedia online encyclopedia, available since October 2011, although the non-secure version is still available – the latter is vulnerable to key word filtering. Anti-censorship group GreatFire urged Wikipedia and users to circumvent the censorship on it by officially resolving to those other IP owned by Wikipedia and by defaulting to https

== Hong Kong and Macau ==
A group from the Hong Kong Federation of Students went on a hunger strike for 64 hours as a show of their passion for freedom and democracy. Students from nine different universities prepared a booklet called 64:24 to educate people about the event, to offer "a factual and academic perspective on Tiananmen." As a prelude to the vigil and in line with previous year, the Hong Kong Alliance in Support of Patriotic Democratic Movements in China organised a "patriotic march" calling for the end of one-party dictatorship. The 2013 march took place in the afternoon on Sunday 26 May, the second Sunday before the anniversary. Turnout was down on the previous year: police estimated 1,200 participants, compared with 2,100 in 2012. Alliance chairman Lee Cheuk-yan explained the theme for the march was "'love the country' does not equal 'love the Communist Party'".

=== Defining patriotism ===
Traditionally organised by the Alliance in Support of Patriotic Democratic Movements in China, the 4 June 2013 candlelight vigil at Victoria Park was to adopt as its main slogan "Love the country, love the people. That's the Hong Kong spirit. Reverse the 4 June verdict. We will never give up". This slogan attracted considerable debate as to what constituted patriotism for the people of Hong Kong, and threatened to derail the commemoration.

Ding Zilin, leader of the pro-democracy group Tiananmen Mothers, was asked by the alliance for her support for the new theme and slogan, "love the country". However, the slogan was strongly denounced by Ding Zilin as "stupid". Ding alleged that Tsui Hon-kwong, standing committee member of the alliance, then replied by email saying that Ding was manifesting Stockholm syndrome and taking pity on the Communist party. Ding was infuriated and demanded Tsui's apology. Tsui resigned from the Alliance. Ding explained that the patriotism concept had become corrupted so that now loving the country equates to loving the Communist Party too. She nevertheless urged Hong Kong people to support the annual vigil.

The pro-democratic Apple Daily said that central government and local pro-establishment factions were exploiting the patriotism debate to divide pro-democracy activists. The BBC noted that Ta Kung Pao, strongly pro-Beijing Hong Kong newspaper that usually ignores the Tiananmen vigil, criticised as localist camp who are boycotting the Victoria Park vigil in favour of their own in Tsim Sha Tsui, saying that the avoidance of patriotism at the Victoria Park vigil could almost be considered an "act of national betrayal". Hong Kong Economic Times and South China Morning Post both called on citizens to set the differences aside and focus on demanding an official vindication of the movement.

The alliance backtracked on the slogan, agreeing to refocus the theme on vindicating 4 June, as it had been in previous years. "'Love the Country' has irritated the nerve of some Hong Kong people ... Patriotism has become a dirty word today," Alliance leader Lee Cheuk-yan said.

=== Candlelight vigils ===
In Hong Kong, amidst torrential downpour and lightning, about 150,000 people attended the vigil on the night of 4 June according to event organisers; the police said estimated the crowd at 54,000. The figures are lower than for the previous year, at 180,000 and 85,000 respectively. The vigil was cut short by heavy rains that short circuited the sound equipment, and planned broadcast of recorded messages from Wang Dan, Tiananmen Mothers member Lu Yanjing, and Li Wangling could not take place. A separate gathering in Tsim Sha Tsui to commemorate the anniversary attracted approximately 200 people.

In Macau, the Joint Committee on the Development of Democracy organised a rally in Senado Square that was attended by "hundreds of citizens" despite the rain. Local lawmakers Ng Kuok Cheong and Au Kam San expressed their concern for democratic development in the PRC despite the economic progress. They said political conditions were becoming democratically unfriendly, as manifest by the corruption within government and controls over of social and economic resources of the country by state monopolies. The Macau rally had to contend with competition from a Children's Day event hosted nearby by the General Association of Chinese Students of Macau, where there was a dance performance with loud background music.

=== Demographic and motivations ===
Journals noted that some people from mainland China attended the event. Donations received in RMB suggest that their numbers were stable compared with last year.

== Republic of China ==
President Ma Ying-jeou, who has been criticised for his "lukewarm" support for the 1989 movement since his election, called on the new Chinese leadership to create a new era for human rights. Ma compared the 1989 crackdown to the 1947 February 28 Incident crackdown by the Nationalist regime on Taiwan – both tragedies that "resulted from the government's improper handling of a popular protest". A forum on human rights in China organised by the DPP was held to commemorate the 24th anniversary of the massacre at which former student leader Wang Dan spoke. Su Tseng-chang, Chairman of the DPP, told the forum that the "Chinese Dream" that CCP General Secretary, President Xi Jinping envisioned can only be achieved once the CCP has dealt with the massacre in an honest manner. The country also needed to ensure the human rights and freedom of its people by establishing social justice, said Su.

The DPP, together with Taiwan Democracy Watch, Taiwan Association for China Human Rights, the Taiwan Association for Human Rights and a student group for the promotion of Democracy in China predicted that the 2013 commemoration would be stronger than previous years. A candlelight vigil had been organised to take place at 8 pm in Liberty Square. In 2013 instead of seeking the political rehabilitation of the victims of the crackdown, organisers stepped up their demands. Unhappy with continued oppression of dissidents by Beijing, organisers said they wanted accountability from those responsible for the massacre. More than 100 people attended, and some donned masks with the face of Liu Xiaobo. Wang Dan addressed mainland Chinese students in their midst, to encourage their pursuit of democratic ideals for the motherland, saying "The darker the sky, the more we need to pursue enlightenment; the longer the road, the more we need to courageously move forward". Recorded messages from dissidents Hu Jia and Chen Guangcheng were played to the assembly.

== Outside China ==
On 31 May, the US State Department once again called upon the Chinese government to protect human rights, to end the harassment of those who took part in the Tiananmen protests, and to "fully account for those killed, detained, or missing." The Chinese foreign ministry angrily warned the US government to "stop interfering in China's internal affairs so as not to sabotage China–US relations." The US congressional committee on foreign affairs held a special hearing where US-based former Tiananmen activists Chai Ling, Yang Jianli and Wei Jingsheng were invited to testify before members of Congress.

== Official response in China ==
At a briefing in Beijing on 3 June 2013, in response to Western demands for human rights, Chinese Foreign Ministry spokesman Hong Lei said his country had reached a "very clear conclusion about the political turmoil and all relevant issues in the late 1980s ... Chinese people enjoy broad freedom and human rights. This is a fact everyone can see."

== See also ==
- Memorials for the Tiananmen Square protests of 1989
- Internet censorship in the People's Republic of China
- Human rights in China
