= Silent protest =

Form of nonviolent protest

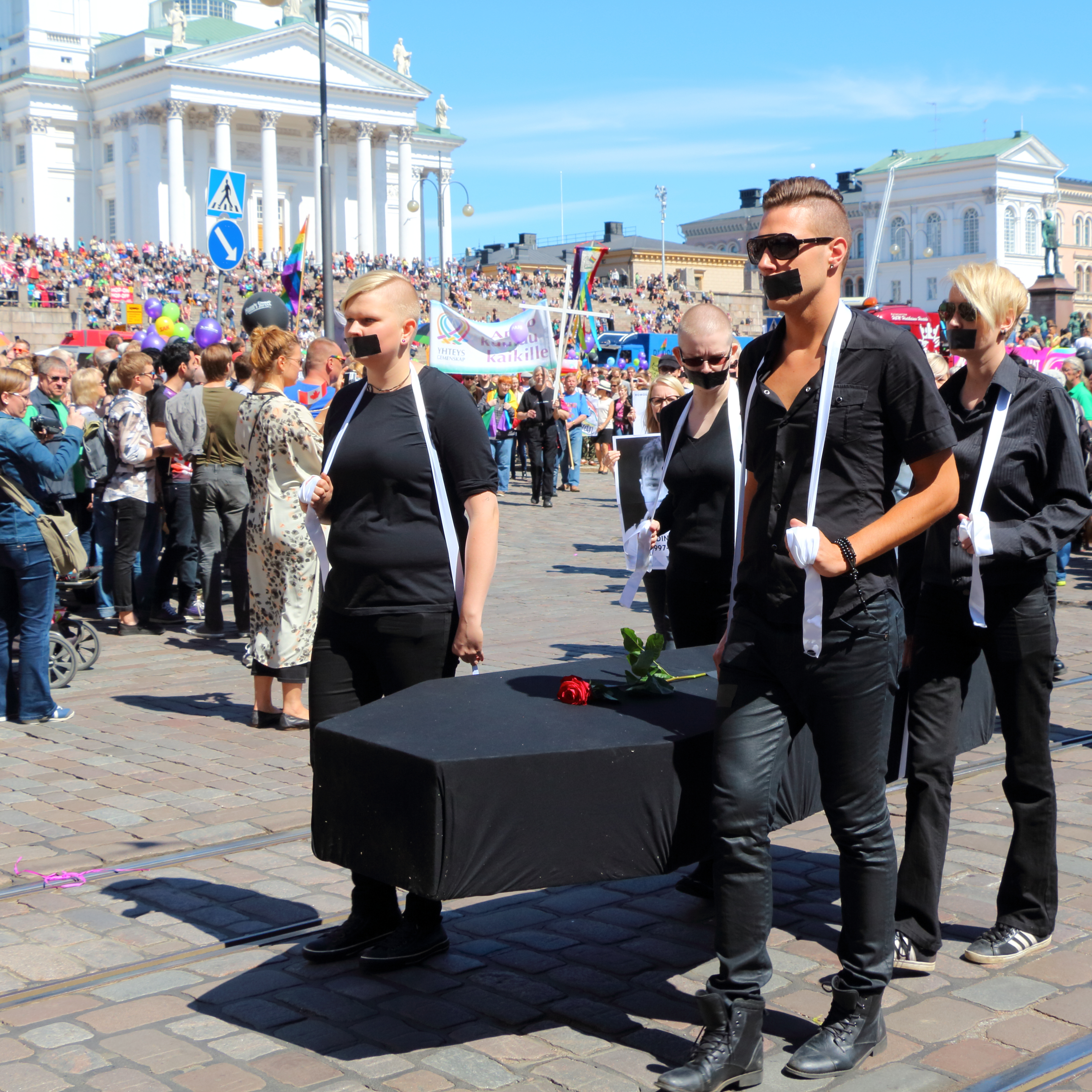
The silent protest Marching for Those Who Can't at Helsinki Pride in 2014

A silent protest is an organized effort where the participants stay quiet to demonstrate disapproval. It is used as a form of civil disobedience and nonviolent resistance that encourages voicing out different opinions through certain acts such as not showing support to a certain product, attending mass parade, having symbolism, and educating and encouraging other people to join the protest. This aims to support and resolve different matters related to inequality, peace making, and nation leadership problems.

== Examples ==
- On July 28, 1917, a Silent Parade took place in New York City to protest lynching.
- 1968 Olympics Black Power salute
- 1968 Summer Olympics – Czech gymnast Věra Čáslavská looked away when the Soviet anthem was playing
- NOH8 Campaign
- 2011 Belarusian protests

== See also ==
- Blank piece of paper (protest tactic)
