= Open Letter asking Xi Jinping to Resign =

Anonymous letter asking Xi Jinping to resign

In March 2016, an anonymous open letter, entitled The Open Letter about Calling for Comrade Xi Jinping's Resigning from His Leading Posts of the Party and the State (Chinese: 关于要求习近平同志辞去党和国家领导职务的公开信; pinyin: guānyú yāoqiú Xí Jìnpíng tóngzhì cíqù dǎng hé guójiā lǐngdǎo zhíwù de gōngkāi xìn), purporting to be from unnamed "loyal Communist Party members", allegedly resulted in the detention of dozens of Chinese citizens, including (temporarily) six relatives of two overseas dissidents.

== Background ==
Chinese media is heavily regulated; government censors often remove content on websites and social media. By 2015, China had 49 reporters in prison, according to the Committee to Protect Journalists; Freedom House had ranked the country as the world's worst abuser of internet freedom. In February 2016, Xi Jinping visited state media outlets in a tour widely seen as an attempt to further rein in journalists and to eradicate freedom of expression. Early 2016 saw a spate of publicized censorship incidents and a crackdown on journalists, lawyers, and dissidents.

In recent years, China has detained relatives of dissident writers living overseas to pressure the writers into self-censorship.

== Publication ==
The open letter asking Xi to resign his post of General Secretary of the Chinese Communist Party (paramount leader and party leader), was first posted on Canyu. It was republished by other outlets, most notably by the state-linked Watching.cn (also known as Wujie News), but was quickly taken down from Watching. The letter accuses Xi of being a dictator and of committing serious economic and diplomatic blunders. The authors claim to be writing the letter out of concern for Xi and his family's "personal safety", which may be an implicit threat. The Wall Street Journal speculates that the open letter may indeed have been penned by dissatisfied insiders within the ruling Communist Party, as unlike typical dissident manifestos, the letter uses Party jargon and contains no call for significant democratic reform. Professor Xiao Qiang of the University of California, Berkeley, agreed the phrasing is unusual: "Bluff or true, this tone sounds more like coup plotters talking to the leader they want to depose, rather than an open letter with dissenting political views." On the other hand, the letter may be an elaborate ruse; there is no independent evidence of any coup plot.

== Full text of the open letter in English ==
Hello Comrade Xi Jinping,

We are loyal Communist Party members. On the occasion of the national "Two Sessions", we write this letter asking you to resign from all Party and state leadership positions. We make this request out of consideration for the Party cause, out of consideration for the nation and its people — and also out of consideration for your personal safety and that of your family.

Comrade Xi Jinping, since your election as General Secretary at the Party's 18th National Congress, your determination to fight corruption by "beating tigers" has led to some improvement in the unhealthy tendency of internal Party corruption. Your personal leadership on several Central Leading Groups working towards comprehensive reform, as well as the great amount of work you've made on economic development, has received some public support, and these efforts have not been unnoticed by us.

However, Comrade Xi Jinping, we have no choice but to point out that, precisely due to your gathering of all power into your own hands and making decisions directly, we are now facing unprecedented problems and crises in all political, economic, ideological, and cultural spheres.

In the political sphere, your abandonment of important Party tradition, including most significantly the abandonment of the democratic system of the collective leadership of the Standing Committee, instead having all leaders at all levels support your position at the "core". has resulted in an excessive concentration of power. While strengthening the power of the Party Committees within the NPC, CPPCC, and the State Council, you've weakened the independent power of all state organs, including that of Premier Li Keqiang and others. Meanwhile, the stationing of Central Disciplinary Inspection Commission patrols in work units and state-owned enterprises has created a new system of power, leading to a lack of clarity at all levels of government, and confusing the decision-making process.

In the diplomatic sphere, your abandonment of Comrade Deng Xiaoping's consistent "hide your strength and bide your time" policy, has not only failed to create a favourable international environment, but has allowed North Korea to complete successful nuclear tests, creating an enormous threat to China's national security; has allowed the United States' successful return to Asia, forming a united front with South Korea, Japan, the Philippines, and South-East Asian countries to jointly contain China. In handling the Hong Kong, Macao, and Taiwan problems, lack of compliance with Comrade Deng Xiaoping's wise concept of "one country, two systems" has created a further dilemma, allowing the Democratic Progressive Party to win power in Taiwan and letting sentiment of Hong Kong independence to rise. Of particular concern regarding Hong Kong, the irregular manner of bringing booksellers to the mainland has directly injured the "one country, two systems" policy.

In the economic sphere, as the head of the Leading Group for Financial and Economic Affairs, your direct involvement in the development of micro- and macroeconomic policy has created instability in the stock market and property market, allowing the wealth of hundreds of thousands of ordinary people to vanish. Supply side reforms and production capacity policies have resulted in large numbers of layoffs at state-owned firms; and the closing of private firms have also led to many layoffs. The "One Belt, One Road" initiative has put a huge amount of foreign exchange reserves into chaotic countries and regions with no return. The excessive consumption of foreign exchange reserves, and renminbi devaluation cycles, has made everyone's confidence decline, has brought the national economy to the verge of collapse. People want change.

On the ideological sphere, your emphasis of the "Media's Party surname" has disregarded the media's character of representing the people, and the entire country is stunned; your support of Zhou Xiaoping and Hua Qianfang as representatives on the literary front has left countless literary and art workers in bitter disappointment; your direct condoning of cultural units to sing your praises, and the appointment of your wife Peng Liyuan's sister as director and producer of the CCTV Spring Festival Gala, has turned the once popular Gala into your personal propaganda tool. Your condoning this cult of personality, disallowing "improper discussion" of the central government, and "one-voice Party" method make those of us who experienced the Cultural Revolution unable to not secretly worry — our Party, country, and people cannot bear another decade of calamity!

Comrade Xi Jinping, your carrying out a high-pressure anti-corruption campaign to correct unhealthy tendencies in the Party has had a helpful effect, but, since there are no supporting measures or objectives, it has given rise to an abundance of "slackness" at all levels of government, with officials too afraid to work, discontent openly voiced by the people, and the deterioration of our economy exacerbated. We also see the main goal of the anti-corruption campaign to be merely a power struggle. We are worried that this type of inner-Party power struggle may also bring risks to the personal safety of you and your family.

Consequently, Comrade Xi Jinping, we feel that you do not possess the capabilities to lead the Party and the nation into the future, and we believe that you are no longer suitable for the post of General Secretary. For the Party cause, for the long-term peace and stability of the country, and for your own personal safety and that of your family, we ask you to resign from all positions of Party and state leadership, and let the Party Central Committee and the people of the nation select a virtuous leader who can vigorously lead us into the future.

Loyal Communist Party Members

March, 2016

== Government response ==
Prominent Chinese columnist Jia Jia was detained for ten days. Chang Ping, a liberal Chinese writer living in Germany, stated that two younger brothers and a younger sister were "abducted by the Chinese police" after Chang criticized Jia's detention. The government also detained the parents and younger brother of another liberal Chinese writer, Wen Yunchao, who lives in the United States. All three writers deny any involvement in the open letter. On March 30, 2016, Deutsche Welle reported that all the detained relatives of both dissidents had been released.

Ouyang Hongliang, the president of Watching, was also detained. According to the BBC, a Watching staff member stated at least 15 other people employed at Watching or an associated technology company had been "taken away". The report that ten of the detained employees worked for the technology company spurred speculation that perhaps the letter was published on Watching by a hacker, or alternatively by some sort of web-crawling software that republishes content.

== See also ==
- Human rights in China
