= 2022 COVID-19 protests in China =

2022 protests following COVID-19 lockdowns in China

- Part of protests over responses to the COVID-19 pandemic, COVID-19 pandemic in mainland China and democracy movements in China
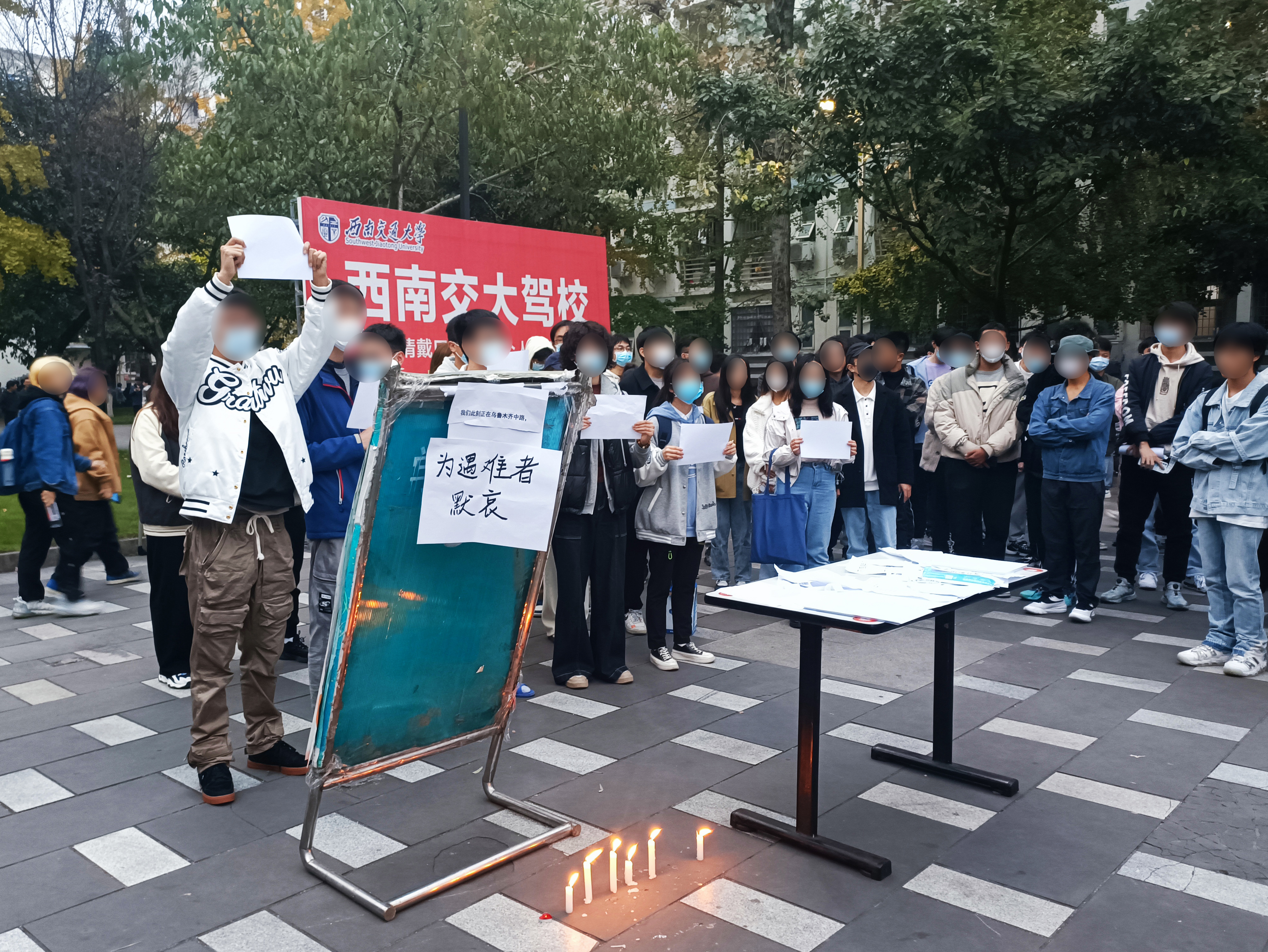
- Southwest Jiaotong University students mourn the victims of the 2022 Ürümqi fire, holding blank sheets of paper and singing "The Internationale" and "March of the Volunteers"
- Date: 2 November – 5 December 2022 (1 month and 3 days)
- Location: Mainland China and Hong Kong (with solidarity protests abroad)
- Caused by: Chinese government response to COVID-19; Zero-COVID policy; Ürümqi fire; Opposition to the Chinese Communist Party, Xi Jinping and the country's deepening authoritarianism (factions); Internet censorship; Censored 2022 FIFA World Cup broadcast; Economic slowdown and lack of basic needs caused by lockdowns; Workplace practices of Foxconn (factions)
- Methods: Protests, protest songs, demonstrations, riots, civil unrest, student activism, internet activism
- Result: Abandonment of the zero-COVID policy on 7 December 2022: Some protesters detained; Images and videos of protests censored by the Chinese government

Parties
Protesters: Chinese Liberals; Chinese New Left (Maoists)	Government of China; People's Police; People's Armed Police
- Cities in China where protests against COVID-19 lockdowns occurred

A series of protests against COVID-19 lockdowns began in mainland China in November 2022. Colloquially referred to as the White Paper Protests (Chinese: 白纸抗议; pinyin: Bái zhǐ kàngyì) or the A4 Revolution (Chinese: 白纸革命; pinyin: Bái zhǐ gémìng), the demonstrations started in response to measures taken by the Chinese government to prevent the spread of COVID-19 in the country, including implementing a zero-COVID policy. Discontent had grown since the beginning of the pandemic towards the policy, which confined many people to their homes for prolonged periods of time without work and left some unable to purchase or receive daily necessities.

The demonstrations had been preceded by the Beijing Sitong Bridge protest on 13 October, wherein pro-democracy banners were displayed by an unnamed individual and later seized by local authorities. The incident was subsequently censored by state media and led to a widespread crackdown behind the Great Firewall. Further small-scale protests inspired by the Sitong Bridge incident ensued in early November, before widespread civil unrest erupted following a 24 November building fire in Ürümqi that killed at least ten people, (Note: While Chinese state-run media reported that ten people had died from the incident, some witnesses interviewed by Radio Free Asia said the number was 44.) three months into a lockdown in Xinjiang. Protesters across the nation demanded the end of the government's zero-COVID policy and lockdowns.

The subjects in protest evolved throughout the course of the unrest, ranging from discontent with the leadership of the Chinese Communist Party (CCP) and its general secretary Xi Jinping, to inhumane working conditions brought on by the lockdowns, and human rights abuses against ethnic Uyghurs in Xinjiang. The police had largely allowed such rallies to proceed, although officers had reportedly arrested several protesters in Shanghai. There had also been reports of protesters being beaten and showered with pepper spray before detainment. By early December, China pivoted away from many of its previous COVID restrictions by reducing testing, reducing lockdowns, and allowing people with mild infections to quarantine at home, effectively abandoning the zero-COVID policy.

== Background ==
=== COVID-19 lockdowns in China ===
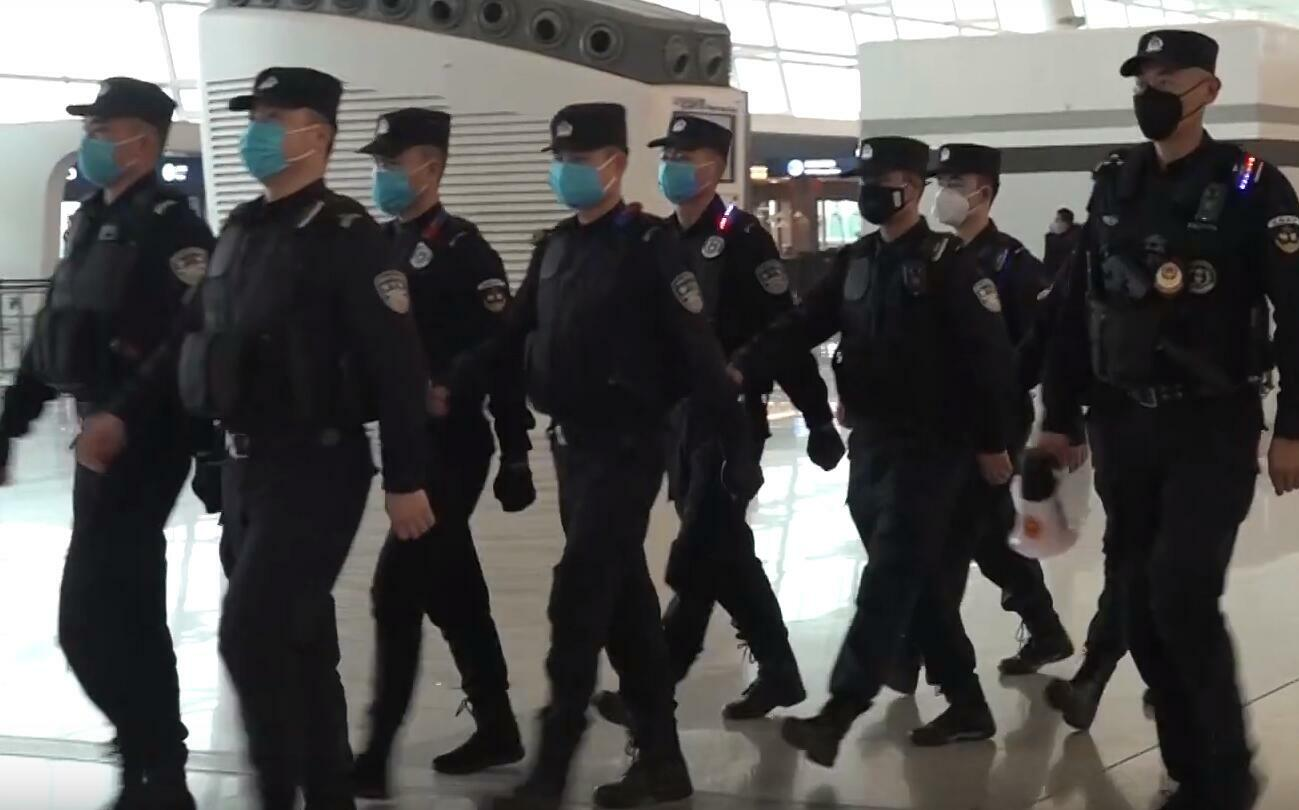
Policemen wearing masks patrolling Wuhan Tianhe International Airport during the initial COVID-19 outbreak in January 2020

Since the beginning of the COVID-19 pandemic in mainland China, the Chinese government has made extensive use of lockdowns to manage outbreaks, in an effort to implement a zero-COVID policy. These lockdowns began with the lockdown of Wuhan in January 2020, and soon spread to other cities and municipalities, including Shanghai and Xinjiang. As these lockdowns became more widespread, they became lengthier and increasingly disruptive, precipitating increasing concern and dissent. In April 2022, the Chinese government imposed a lockdown in Shanghai, generating outrage on social media sites, such as Sina Weibo and WeChat. Citizens were displeased with the economic effects of the lockdown, such as food shortages and the inability to work. This discontent was exacerbated by reports of poor conditions in makeshift hospitals and harsh enforcement of quarantines. These complaints were difficult to suppress, despite the strict censorship of social media in China.

The spread of more infectious subvariants of the Omicron variant intensified these grievances. As these subvariants spread, public trust was eroded in the Chinese government's zero-COVID policy, indicating that lockdown strategies had become ineffective and unsustainable for the Chinese economy. Concessions and vacillation generated a further lack of confidence and support for the policy. On 11 November, the Chinese government announced new and detailed guidelines on COVID measures in an attempt to ease the zero-COVID policy. Enforcement by local governments varied widely: Shijiazhuang temporarily lifted most restrictions following the announcement, while other cities continued with strict restrictions, fearing the consequences of easing lockdowns. Following the rollout of the new guidelines, an outbreak of COVID-19 occurred in multiple regions of China.

=== Democracy movements of China ===
Various political movements for democracy have sprung up in opposition to the Chinese Communist Party (CCP)'s one-party rule. The growing discontent with the Chinese government's response to COVID-19 has precipitated discussions of freedom and democracy in China and some calls for the resignation of Xi Jinping, who was endorsed for an unprecedented third term as CCP general secretary (the top position in China) weeks before the beginning of the widespread protests.

=== Sitong Bridge protest ===
On 13 October 2022, on the eve of the 20th National Congress of the Chinese Communist Party, a man hung two anti-lockdown and pro-democracy banners on the parapet of the Sitong Bridge in Beijing. The banners were swiftly removed by the local police, and mentions of it were censored from the Chinese Internet. Despite this, the news became widespread among the Chinese public. It later inspired the principal goals of the upcoming protests. By 26 November, the banners' slogans had been re-echoed by nationwide protesters.

== Early protests ==
=== Lanzhou ===
On 2 November, the death of a 3-year-old boy to a gas leak in Lanzhou, reportedly after a delay in receiving treatment due to movement restrictions, had triggered a wave of public anger. Videos on social media showed residents taking to the streets demanding answers from authorities and buses containing SWAT teams arriving at the scene. Local authorities issued apologies the next day.

=== Guangzhou ===
As lockdowns returned to Guangzhou starting on 5 November, residents of Haizhu District marched in the streets on the night of 15 November, breaking through metal barriers and demanding an end to the lockdown. The Haizhu district is home to many migrant workers (Mingong) from outside the province, who were unable to find work and unable to have sustainable incomes during lockdowns. In videos spread online, residents also criticized hour-long queues for COVID testing, an inability to purchase fresh and affordable produce, and a lack of local government support.

=== Zhengzhou Foxconn factory ===
In late October, Taiwanese electronics manufacturer Foxconn began preventing workers at its mega-factory in Zhengzhou from leaving the premises, concluding that this was the best way of fulfilling the government's dual mandate of preventing infections and maintaining economic activity. Nevertheless, some workers managed to scale barriers and flee to their homes, threatening the continued operation of the plant. In early November, videos spread of workers leaving the city by foot to return home in defiance of lockdown measures. In response, in mid-November, local governments around the country urged veterans and retired civil servants to sign up as replacement labor, promising bonuses. State media claimed that more than 100,000 people had signed up by 18 November.

On the night of 22–23 November, workers at a Foxconn factory clashed with security forces and police over poor pay and haphazard COVID restrictions. Workers articulated their demands in videos spread across Chinese social media, claiming that Foxconn had failed to provide promised bonuses and salary packages. According to one worker, new recruits were told by Foxconn that they would receive the bonuses in March and May 2023, long after the Chinese Lunar New Year, when money was needed the most. Protesters also accused Foxconn of neglecting to separate workers who had tested positive from others, all while preventing them from leaving the factory campus because of quarantine measures. Law enforcement was filmed beating workers with batons and metal rods, while workers threw objects back and overturned police vehicles. In response, Foxconn offered 10,000 yuan (approximately US$1,400) and a free ride home to workers who agreed to quit their jobs and leave the factory.

=== Chongqing ===
In Chongqing, a man was filmed giving a speech in his residential compound on 24 November, loudly proclaiming in Chinese, "Give me liberty or give me death!" (Note: Chinese: 不自由，毋宁死！. This is the formal translation of Patrick Henry's phrase used by scholars.) to the cheers and applause of the crowd. When law enforcement officials attempted to arrest him, the crowd fought off the police and pulled him away, although he was ultimately still detained. The man was dubbed the "Chongqing superman-brother" (重庆超人哥) online. Quotes by him from the video were widely circulated despite censorship, such as, "there is only one disease in the world and that is being both poor and not having freedom [...] we have now got both", referring to both the lockdown and high food prices.

== Escalation: Ürümqi fire and reaction ==
On 24 November, a fire in a building in Ürümqi killed ten people and wounded nine in a residential area under lockdown. The Xinjiang region had already been in a strict lockdown for three months by that point. During this time, videos and images circulated on Chinese social media showed people unable to purchase basic necessities such as food and medicine. People accused the lockdown measures around the building for preventing firefighters from being able to reach the site in time, while others expressed anger at the government's response, which appeared to victim blame those who managed to escape the fire. All ten of the dead were Uyghur people, with five of them living in the same household.

On 25 November, a protest started in the Han-dominant Xinjiang Production and Construction Corps 104th Regiment as residents took to the streets in direct response to a public beating committed by disease control personnel. A wave of protests soon started across the city, demanding an end to the harsh lockdown measures, with a crowd outside the city government building. The secretary-general was forced to make a public speech, promising an end to lockdown in "low-risk" areas by the next day.

=== 26 November ===
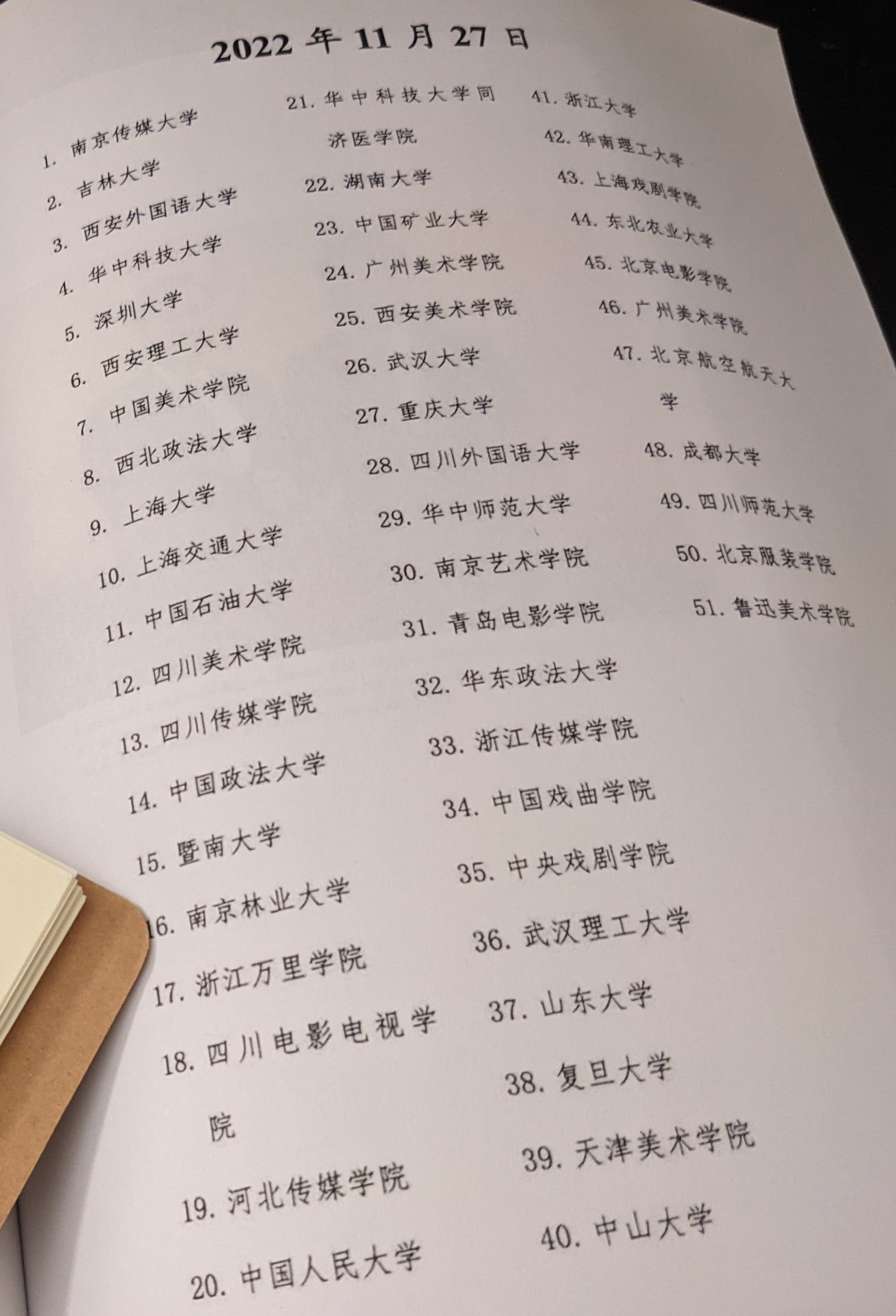
List circulated by Chinese students, including 51 universities, with anti-lockdown demonstrations as of 27 November

By 26 November, protests and memorials in solidarity with the victims of the Ürümqi fire had spread to large Chinese cities such as Nanjing, Xi'an, and Shanghai.

==== Nanjing ====
On 26 November, in Nanjing, satirical posters against the zero-COVID policy were removed, and in protest, a student stood on the steps of the Communication University of China, Nanjing, holding a blank sheet of paper, until it was snatched from her. Subsequently, hundreds of students gathered on the steps with blank sheets of paper to hold a candlelight vigil for victims of the fire, using phone flashlights as stand-ins for candles and held up blank pieces of paper in reference to the censorship surrounding the event. A student participating in the rally, who stated he was from Xinjiang, spoke: "Before I felt I was a coward, but now at this moment I feel I can stand up. I speak for my home region, speak for those friends who lost relatives and kin in the fire disaster, and for the deceased". An unidentified man arrived to rebuke the protesting crowd, saying that "one day you'll pay for everything you did today", with students replying that "the state will also have to pay the price for what it has done".

==== Lanzhou ====
On 26 November, videos filmed protesters in Lanzhou destroying tents and booths for COVID-19 testing. Protesters alleged that they were put under lockdown despite there being zero positive cases in the area. Earlier in November, a case in Lanzhou had circulated on social media where a 3-year-old boy died before he could be taken to the hospital in time due to lockdown measures, sparking backlash and anger online.

==== Shanghai ====
The largest protest on 26 November appeared in Shanghai, as young people gathered on Ürümqi Middle Road (乌鲁木齐中路, officially "Wulumuqi Rd (M)"), in reference to the city where the fire took place. They lit candles and laid flowers in mourning for the victims of the fire. They also held pieces of blank paper over their faces or heads; white is the traditional colour of mourning in China. Videos showed chants openly criticizing CCP general secretary Xi Jinping's administration, with hundreds chanting "Step down, Xi Jinping! Step down, Communist Party!" Videos circulating on social media also showed the crowd facing police, chanting slogans such as "serve the people", "we want freedom", and "we don't want the Health Code". Some people sang the national anthem, "March of the Volunteers", during the protest. In the early morning hours, police suddenly surrounded the crowd and arrested several people. Police also used pepper spray and hand-to-hand violence to disperse the protesters and made arrests.

==== Chengdu ====
In Chengdu, crowds gathered in the streets and chanted, "We don't want lifelong rulers. We don't want emperors."

==== Xi'an ====
A mobile-lit vigil was also held at the Xi'an Academy of Fine Arts, which attracted hundreds of demonstrators, according to posts circulated on social media.

==== Korla ====
A video emerged of hundreds gathered in the prefecture's government office in Korla, calling "Lift the lockdown!". Like the protesters in Ürümqi, many of those protesting in Korla were reported to be of Han ethnicity. An official came out and promised that lockdowns would be eased; he was welcomed by the crowd.

=== 27 November ===
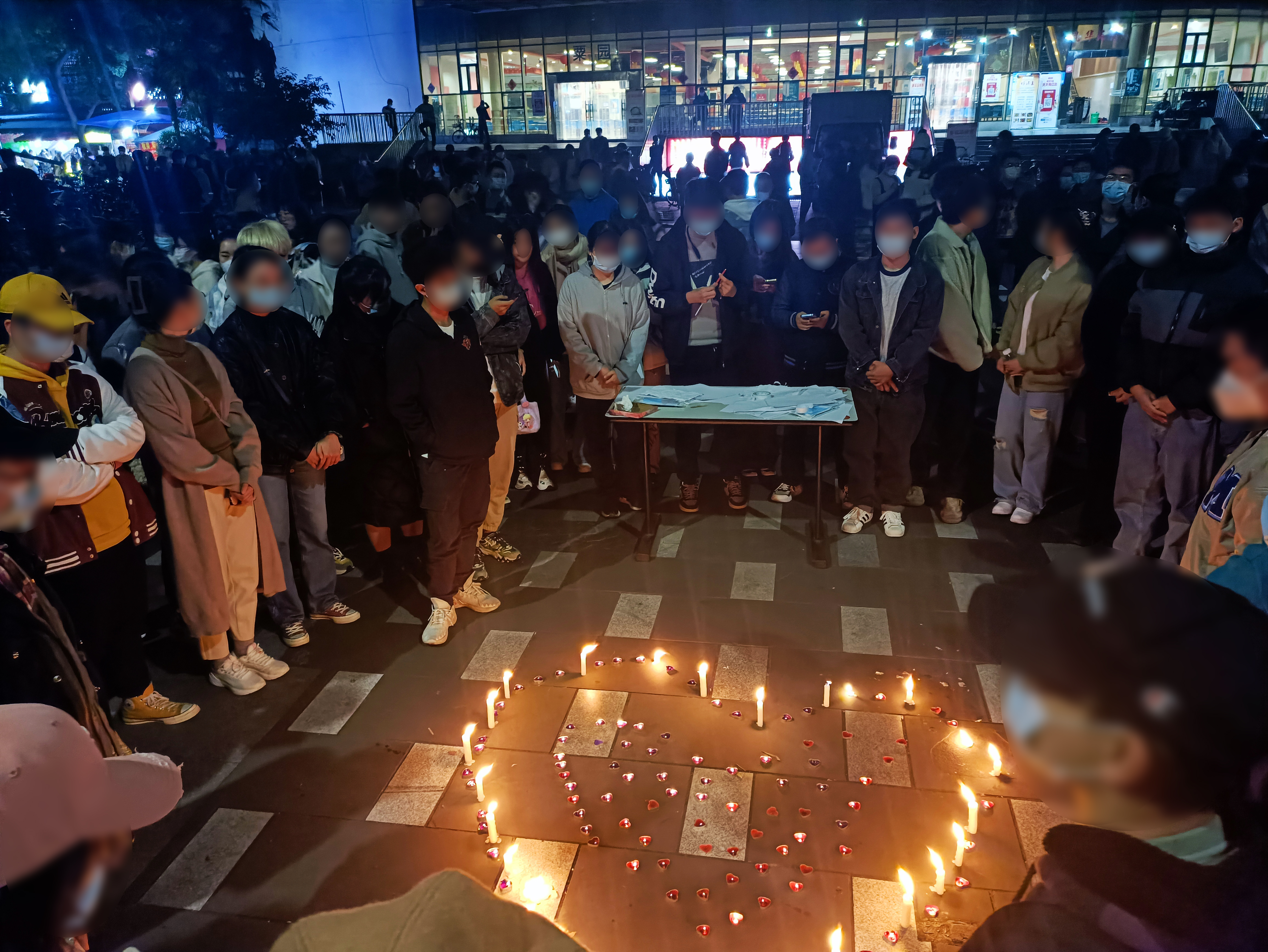
Students at Southwest Jiaotong University, Chengdu, holding a candlelight vigil for victims of the fire

==== Shanghai ====
In Shanghai, the Associated Press saw some bystanders charged and tackled by police near an intersection where there had previously been protests, although the bystanders were not visibly expressing dissent. A protestor said police had tried to arrest him, but the crowd around him had pulled him free so he could escape.

On 27 November, BBC News journalist Edward Lawrence was assaulted by Shanghai police, and detained for several hours. Footage circulated on social media showed Lawrence being dragged to the ground in handcuffs. The responding authorities stated that they arrested him "for his own good" so that he would not catch COVID-19 from the crowd. The BBC News press team rebuked those claims as "not a credible explanation".

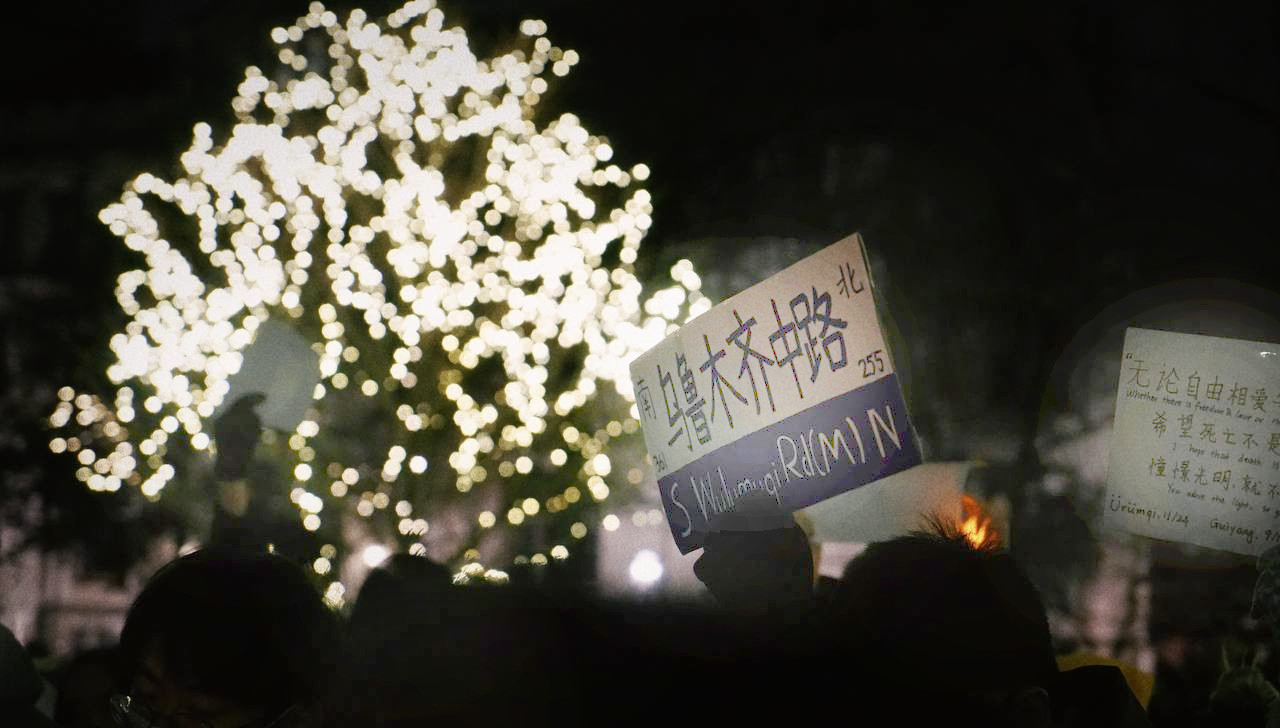
A mock Ürümqi Middle Road street sign at a candlelight vigil in the United States

A photograph appeared to show police removing the Ürümqi Road's street sign later that night.

==== Beijing ====
At least 1,000 people gathered along Beijing's third ring road on 27 November to protest COVID restrictions. The Beijing people chanted, "We are all Shanghai people! We are all Xinjiang people!". Potentially due to proximity to political power in the nation's capital city, demonstrators in Beijing debated the use of explicitly political slogans, such as calling for Xi to step down, versus more narrowly opposing severe COVID controls, as well as whether to call it a protest or a simply a vigil. Participants discussed demands that the movement could agree upon, such as an apology for the Ürümqi fire, while others worried about police infiltration of marches, since some demonstrators had already received calls from local police.

On 27 November, students held a memorial at Tsinghua University in Beijing, contributing to student demonstrations taking place at over 50 university campuses throughout China. The protest began at 11:30 when some students held up signs outside the canteen and some hundreds joined them. They chanted "freedom will prevail" and sang "The Internationale". A female student from Tsinghua University said over a loudspeaker: "If because we are afraid of being arrested, we don't speak, I believe our people would be disappointed in us. As a Tsinghua student, I would regret this my whole life!"

At Peking University, graffiti and banners echoed those of the Sitong bridge protest, but demonstrators did not gather until midnight local time. By 02:00, there were between one and two hundred. They sang "The Internationale" and chanted hesitantly. "No to COVID tests, yes to freedom!" was one of the slogans.

Later that evening, some Beijing protesters gathered on both banks of the Liangma River, also singing "The Internationale" and "March of the Volunteers". One remarked "do not forget those who died in the Guizhou bus crash... do not forget freedom", referring to a September incident in which a bus taking locals to a COVID-19 quarantine center crashed, killing 27 people. In a confrontation between protesters and their opponents in Beijing, protesters were told not to be manipulated by foreign influences, with one protester replying, "by foreign influence do you mean Marx and Engels?" and, "We can't even go on foreign websites!" Others in Beijing chanted slogans echoing the banners of the October Beijing Sitong Bridge protest, such as "Remove the traitor-dictator Xi Jinping!"

At around 01:00 local time on 28 November, an official came to talk to the riverside protesters. At around 02:00, police marched in, and the protesters were dispersed. Police presence continued through 28 November.

==== Wuhan ====
Hundreds of people protested in Wuhan on 27 November, with many destroying metal barricades that surrounded locked-down communities, overturning COVID testing tents and demanding an end to lockdowns, while some demanded Xi to resign.

==== Hong Kong ====
Small-scale demonstrations took place in Hong Kong in solidarity with the protests in mainland China. On 27 November, at the University of Hong Kong, two students from the mainland distributed leaflets relating to the Ürümqi fire, prompting campus security to call in the police for assistance, but ultimately, no arrests were made. Also on the university's campus the same day, a group of students held up blank pieces of paper.

=== 28 November ===
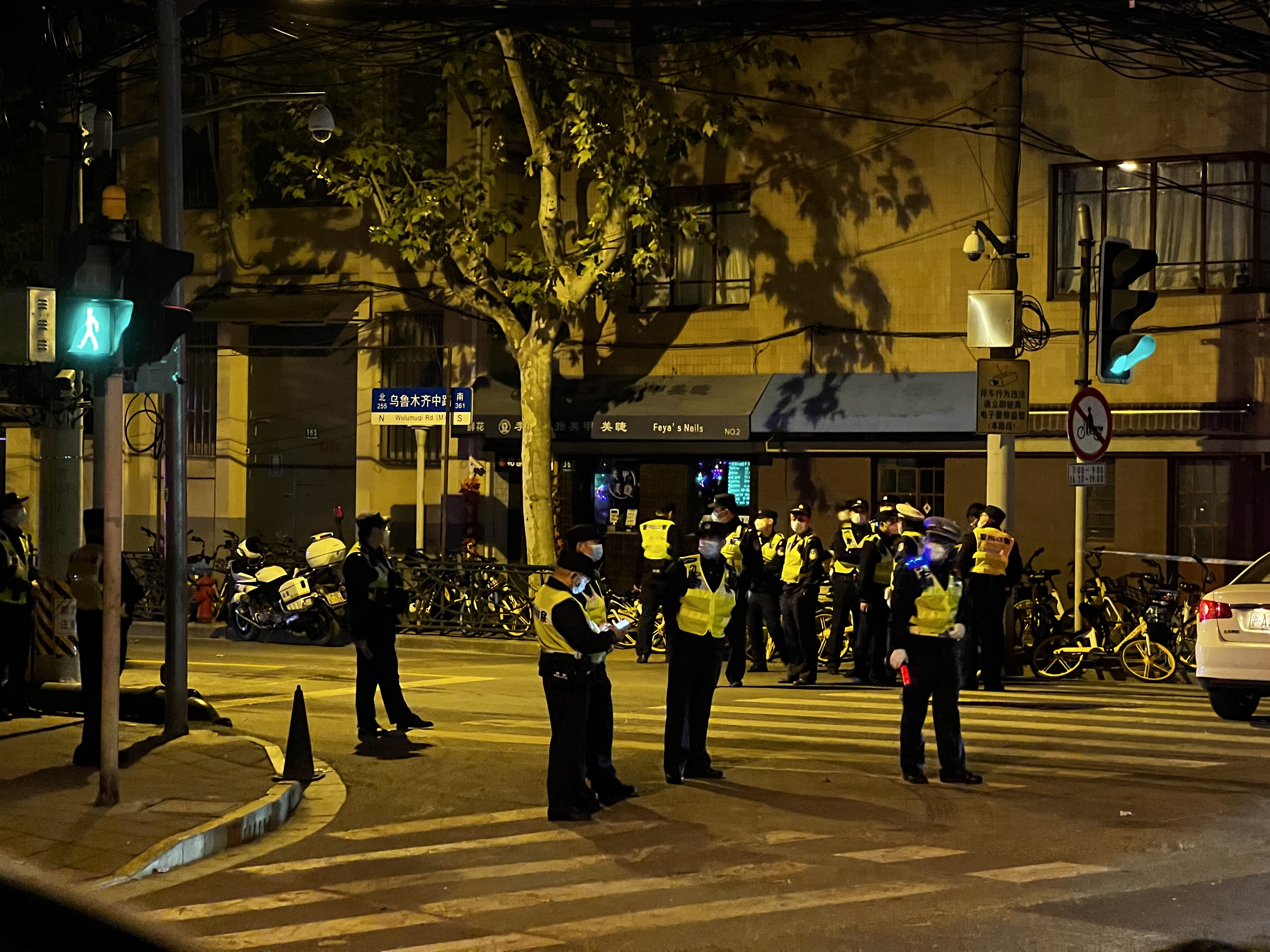
Police barricade on Ürümqi Middle Road. At one point, dozens of police officers stood shoulder-to-shoulder across the end of the street.

Video of Ürümqi Middle Road on 28 November. A later video shows the road filled with parked transports

At the start of the school week, university students in Beijing and Guangzhou were sent home, with classes and final exams being moved online. Universities said they were protecting students from COVID-19, yet on the same day, China had also reported its first day-over-day decline in cases since 19 November.

==== Shanghai ====
After two days of protests in Shanghai, police erected barricades in Ürümqi Middle Road on 28 November. Later that evening, police were out checking the phones of pedestrians in Shanghai, in which they were specifically instructed to look for VPNs, Telegram, and Twitter.

Protesters had planned to gather in the People's Square, but a large police presence prevented it. An attempt to change location was prevented when police also got there first.

==== Hong Kong ====
Over two dozen people took part in a demonstration in central Hong Kong, also holding up blank placards.

==== Hangzhou ====
On the evening of 28 November in Hangzhou, hundreds of citizens held a demonstration at the intersection of Hubin Yintai in 77, demanding the authorities to release the detained protesters. Around the same time, a driver played the song "Do You Hear the People Sing?" in the background while waiting for the traffic lights at the intersection near the in 77 shopping district and was cheered on by passersby.

==== Beijing ====
As universities began to shutter across Beijing, nine Tsinghua University dorms were closed, with positive COVID-19 cases as the reason given. Meanwhile, as the Beijing Forestry University closed, the administration noted that no students or faculty had tested positive. Heavy police presence in the capital prevented demonstrators from gathering.

The Guardian reported that six protesters were called by police that night asking for information about their actions, including one whose home was visited after refusing to answer the phone.

=== 29 November ===
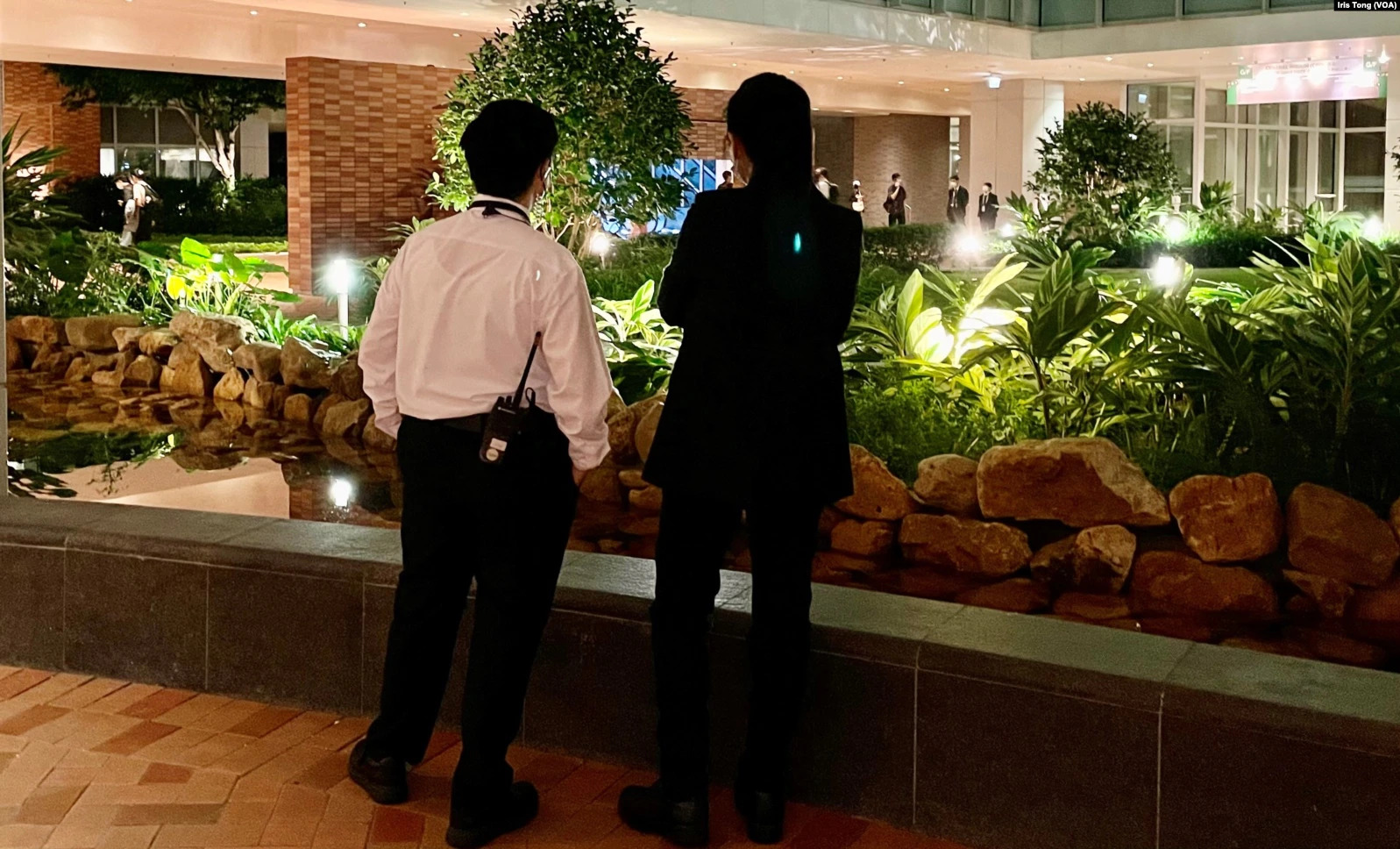
Security personnel standing by at Hong Kong University on 29 November

As on the previous day, there were crowds of police at the sites of past protests. In Shanghai, the sidewalks of Ürümqi Road were barricaded along the full length with two-meter-tall solid blue barricades. The People's Square in central Shanghai, where a protest had been planned for the night, was also heavily patrolled, with police stopping people, checking mobile phones, and asking if they had installed virtual private networks; all but one exit of the subway station there was closed off. Surveillance techniques previously used in Xinjiang were implemented in several cities. University administrations responded to the rallies held the previous days by telling students that they could leave early for winter break, offering free rail and air travel to take them home.

By midday, there had been at least 43 small-scale protests in 22 cities.

Videos showed small-scale protests inside locked-down developments, with residents demanding to be freed.

On social networks outside the Chinese government's control, protesters planned how to track the police, use multiple mobile phones, and form small clusters in order to continue protesting.

In a press conference live-streamed to a state media account on Sina Weibo, Chinese health authorities pledged a rectification of anti-COVID-19 measures. Live audience comments included, "We've cooperated with you for three years, now it's time to give our freedom back" and "Can you stop filtering our comments? Listen to the people, the sky won't fall".

==== Jinan ====
Video footage obtained by Reuters showed protesters struggling against police and barricades in the Lixia District of Jinan, the capital city of Shandong province. Protesters joined in chanting "lift the lockdown" as they attempted to push their way through barricades erected to enforce local lockdowns.

==== Guangzhou ====
Fresh protests arose in the Haizhu District of Guangzhou late in the evening of 29 November. Witnesses said that roughly 100 police officers converged on the district's Houjiao village and arrested at least three of the protesters. Police were wearing hazmat suits and held riot shields to protect themselves from debris as they attempted to contain the demonstration. Barriers were torn down, the crowd threw objects, possibly glass bottles, and tear gas was used. Local authorities later stated that businesses would be allowed to re-open and the lockdown would be lightened. Other city districts of Guangzhou also cancelled mass testing and lightened lockdowns.

=== 30 November ===
Hundreds of government vans, SUVs, and armoured vehicles were parked along city streets; police and paramilitary forces continued to randomly check citizens' IDs and mobile phones, looking for foreign apps, photos of the protests, or other evidence that people had taken part. Online mentions of the protests continued to be deleted.

Upon the death of former CCP general secretary Jiang Zemin on the same day at 12:13 local time, censors moved to restrict Weibo comments related to his death, as some Weibo users had begun to compare his presidency to the current administration, in thinly veiled criticisms of current CCP general secretary Xi Jinping. Some protesters on Telegram groups mentioned his death as an opportunity to gather in his honour and vent anger against the government's policies.

=== 4 December ===
==== Wuhan ====
On 4 December, renewed protests broke out at Wuhan University, with students asking to be allowed to freely return home due to lockdown hardships which included frequent virus testing, reduced access to food, and insufficient hot water supply in some dormitory buildings. Students felt that these problems made remaining at the university untenable and protesters further demanded openness and transparency regarding the school's processes going forward. Protest organizers asked students not to hold up white papers or chant anti-government slogans to increase the odds of success and the university relented, allowing students to take classes in person or return home to attend classes remotely.

=== 5 December ===
==== Nanjing ====
Students at Nanjing Tech University protested against a COVID-19 lockdown after just one positive case was found at the university. The students were displeased with poor communication from the university and worried about not being able to travel home for the winter holidays. Videos of the protest were posted on Twitter, showing students shouting, "We want to go home!" and, "Leaders, step down!" as a police car arrived on the scene.

=== Abroad ===
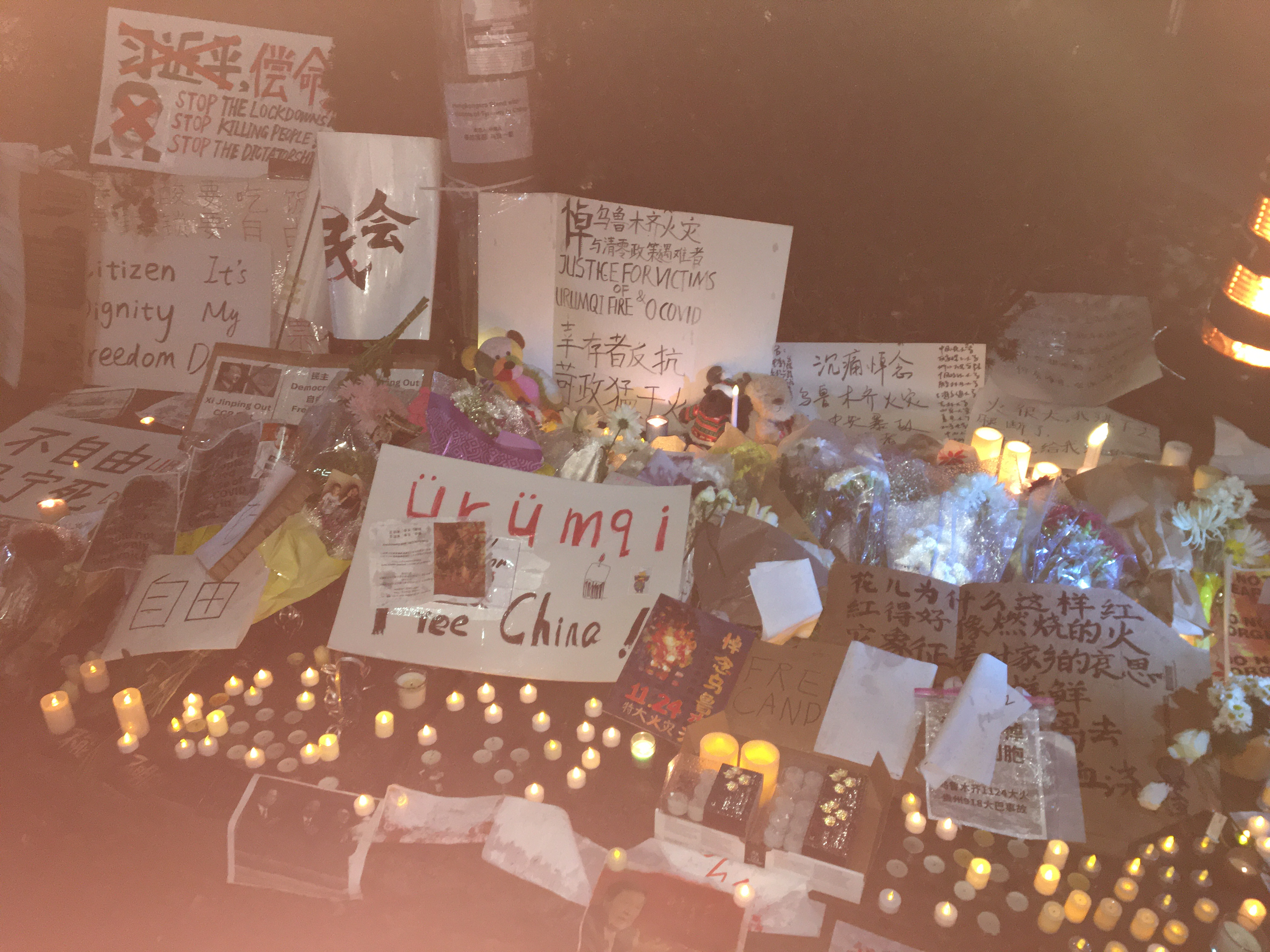
Vigil outside the Chinese Consulate in Toronto, Canada, on 27 November

A vigil attended by around 80 to 100 people was held on 27 November at Liberty Square in Taipei, Taiwan, in solidarity with the protests in China. Speakers included Wang Dan and Zhou Fengsuo, activists who participated in the 1989 Tiananmen Square protests.

Protests and vigils have also taken place in other cities, including Tokyo, London, Brisbane, Paris, and Amsterdam. A member of esports organisation Alliance was placed under investigation after she staged a solo protest outside the Chinese embassy in Tanglin, Singapore.

In the United States, vigils held by overseas Chinese took place at a variety of universities, including Yale University, Stanford University, Harvard University, and Carnegie Mellon University. On 29 November, the New York-based Chinese Alliance for Democracy (CAD) made a declaration of support for pro-democracy protesters in the wake of the protests in Shanghai, and further vigils took place outside Chinese diplomatic missions in the US, with approximately 400 people attending a vigil outside the Chinese consulate in New York City and roughly 200 outside the Chinese consulate in Chicago. One day earlier, during a 28 November vigil at Columbia University, a 21-year-old protestor was beaten unconscious and hospitalized, though some witnesses claimed that the assailant had mistakenly attacked the wrong person and had intended to attack a female counterprotester who had just spoken to the crowd.

== Censorship and resistance ==
The broadcasts of the 2022 FIFA World Cup in China showed scenes of spectators in Qatar without COVID-19 restrictions, in contrast to stringent lockdowns in China, after which protests erupted across China against COVID policies. On 22 November, a social media post, titled Ten Questions, went viral on WeChat, asking the rhetorical question of whether Qatar was "on a different planet" for having minimal COVID-19 control measures. The post was shortly taken down, but not before archives could be made outside the Chinese Internet. In response to the outburst of protests, Chinese state broadcaster CCTV cut close-up shots of the maskless audience and replaced them with shots of the players, officials, or venues.

Protesters and their supporters spread information on the protests across social media, and received support from overseas groups in information security and evading censorship. At the demonstration at Tsinghua University in Beijing on 27 November, the Friedmann equations were used as a sign of protest as a play on the physicist's last name, a near homophone for "free man", "freed man", or even "freedom". Later that evening, protesters near Liangma Bridge began to chant ironically, "I want to do COVID tests! I want to scan my health code!", stimulating Weibo users into using similar phrases to avoid censorship. Crowds everywhere preemptively sang "March of the Volunteers" and "The Internationale" to avoid being accused by authorities of being unpatriotic or incited by foreign forces. Video clips of Xi Jinping's speeches were also used in protest, with people quoting his statement, "now the Chinese people are organized and aren't to be trifled with" to avoid censorship and express discontent. Protesters have also adopted the phrase "banana peel, shrimp moss" in online discussions, since "banana peel" (香蕉皮) has the same Chinese pinyin initials as "Xi Jinping", and "shrimp moss" (虾苔) is a homophone of "step down" (下台) in Mandarin Chinese, albeit with different tones.

Internet censors censored the images and videos circulating on Chinese social media, but then they began circulating on Twitter, which has long been blocked by the Great Firewall in China. Many people from within China resorted to privately sending videos of protests to an overseas Twitter account named Teacher Li Is Not Your Teacher, who then posts these videos for the Western public to see. Li's following on Twitter soon quadrupled to 800,000, which included journalists and activists, and some of his videos were broadcast on television.

On Twitter, Chinese-language hashtags for cities with active demonstrations were reportedly flooded with spam from accounts suspected to be Chinese government-run. A similar phenomenon is observed in Chinese social media, where government work units employed a technique called "comment flooding". As the Ili (Yili) Kazakh Autonomous Prefecture in Xinjiang had entered a 40-plus day lockdown that deprived many of urgent medical care and other needs, the hashtag "Yili Super Topic" was filled with residents pleading for help. To counteract the negativity, a government directive was sent out, instructing work units to "open a campaign of comment flooding on this Weibo Super Topic in accordance with work practices from the autonomous prefecture’s training session for internet commentary personnel." According to the directive, comment flooding topics "may include domestic life, daily parenting, cooking, or personal moods. All internet commentary personnel should post once per hour (twice in total), but not in rapid succession! Repeat: not in rapid succession!"

=== Pro-government responses ===
Pro-government social media commentators portrayed protesters as unwitting pawns of "Western agents", and as followers of the Hong Kong pro-democracy movement. They characterized the protests as "stirring up trouble [in] the typical colour revolution way". Protesters were also condemned for "using their worst malice to agitate members of the public who don't understand their true nature — especially university students and intellectuals whose heads are stuffed with Western ideas — to join in".

=== Blank paper symbolism ===
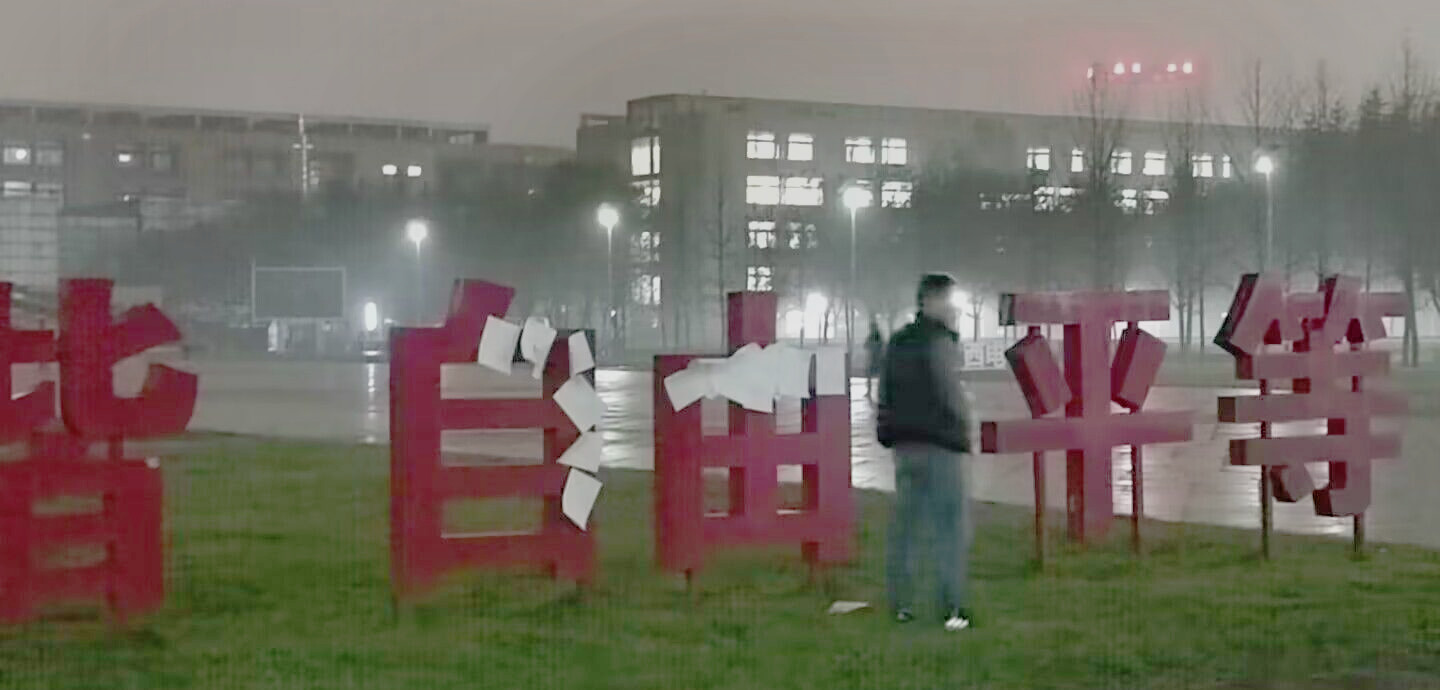
Blank pieces of paper stuck to the characters "自由" ("Freedom"), part of the Core Socialist Values slogan board at Xidian University, during the protests

Blank A4-sized sheets of paper quickly became a symbol of the protests, with protesters at Tsinghua University showing blank A4 sheets of paper to represent censorship in China. Blank sheets of paper became a way for protesters to recognize like-minded others. Protesters also carried white flowers, standing with paper or flowers at intersections.

Chinese diaspora communities promoted the terms "white paper revolution" and "A4 revolution" on social media to describe the protests. By 28 November, posts containing blank papers, harmless sentences, and Friedmann equations had been removed from Chinese social media platforms.

== Detentions ==
Some demonstrators were detained immediately following the protests while still others were detained in the weeks to follow, charged with "picking quarrels and provoking trouble". Although some individuals were released soon afterwards, or just in advance of the Lunar New Year, others remained in detention or were formally charged.

One Chinese woman accused Chinese authorities of forcing some to sign blank arrest warrants and detaining them in secret locations.

According to the Beijing police department contacted by the NPR, the detentions involved a "national security matter". Universities from the UK, US, and Australia confirmed that former Chinese students from their institutions had been detained following the protests and Reporters Without Borders noted that four of the detainees were journalists.

Publishing house editor Cao Zhixin was released on 19 April 2023, alongside three of her friends who had also participated in the protests, after four months of police custody following her December 2022 detention.

Kamile Wayit, a Uyghur university student, was released on 28 December 2025 after completing a three-year sentence for "promoting extremism." She had been sentenced in March 2023 for sharing a video on WeChat related to the November 2022 "A4 protests" in China. Upon her release, Wayit was reunited with her family and is reported to be in good health.

In December 2024, a Chinese student returning from Australia was reportedly sentenced to six years in prison for participating in pro-democracy protests in Sydney, including solidarity rallies for ethnic minorities. The student, who had planned to remain in Australia after graduation, lost contact with friends and employers by January 2025.

== Reactions ==
=== China ===
PRC Foreign Ministry spokesman Zhao Lijian said at a regular press conference on 28 November that, "On social media there are forces with ulterior motives that relate this fire with the local response to COVID-19", and, "We believe that with the leadership of the Chinese Communist Party and support of the Chinese people, our fight against COVID-19 will be successful." Regarding the case of BBC News journalist Edward Lawrence being assaulted and briefly detained in Shanghai, he stated that he was aware of the situation, but claimed it was caused by Lawrence's failure to identify himself properly.

The Chinese government signaled plans to ease restrictions. On 30 November, vice premier Sun Chunlan announced that pandemic controls were entering a "new stage and mission", adding that the Omicron variant is less virulent and that rectification of control methods were underway. Sun said local governments should "respond to and resolve the reasonable demands of the masses".

On 1 December, Xi commented to European Council president Charles Michel that he believes students, who were frustrated by the prolonged strict COVID measures, were behind the protests.

On 7 December, Lu Shaye, China's ambassador to France, linked the protests to foreign forces, arguing that the real protests only took place on the first day and were then controlled by foreign forces to "trigger a color revolution" and that "white is also a color".

==== Hong Kong ====
Hong Kong security minister Chris Tang claimed that demonstrators in solidarity with the mainland protests attempted to "incite [others] to target the central authorities", and that the activities held were "not random" and were "highly organised", while also claiming that some individuals who were "active in the black-clad violence in 2019" also took part in the events.

=== International ===
==== Countries ====
- Canada: Prime Minister Justin Trudeau expressed his support for freedom of speech in China.
- Germany: German President Frank-Walter Steinmeier asked Chinese authorities to "respect" the freedom of protesters and that he "understand[s] why people want to voice their impatience and grievance". He said that he hoped the Chinese authorities would respect the protesters' rights to freedom of expression and freedom of demonstration, and that the protests would remain peaceful. German government spokesperson Steffen Hebestreit suggested that the Chinese government should address its strict COVID lockdown policies by administering Western-made mRNA vaccines, which Germany and Europe had a "very good experience with" and had allowed most countries to ease COVID restrictions.
- Republic of China (Taiwan): The Mainland Affairs Council of the Republic of China (Taiwan) called on the PRC to treat protesters peacefully and rationally and to gradually loosen up COVID restrictions. The Democratic Progressive Party called on the government to actively listen and respond to the demands of the people.
- United Kingdom: In response to the arrest of BBC journalist Edward Lawrence, British Prime Minister Rishi Sunak described it as "shocking and unacceptable" and that China was moving towards "even greater authoritarianism". British Foreign Secretary James Cleverly called the incident "deeply disturbing" and it was "clear" that the people of China were "deeply unhappy" about the COVID restrictions. Business Secretary Grant Shapps said that there was "absolutely no excuse whatsoever" for journalists covering the protests to be attacked by police.
- United States: The Biden administration, via National Security Council spokesman John Kirby, voiced support for the protests, and that President Biden was being briefed on the situation. The U.S. Embassy in Beijing said that Ambassador Nick Burns had raised concerns directly with senior Chinese officials. A senior US official stated that the White House was very careful to not overstate the nature of the protest and recognised that the majority of the protests in a country with a large population of over one billion people appeared "small, localized, and aimed more at the narrow goals of ending the COVID lockdowns and securing better working conditions than a loftier push for democracy." The embassy encouraged American citizens to keep a 14-day supply of water, food, and medication for their household. On 1 December, Chief Medical Advisor to the President, Anthony Fauci, said that China's lockdowns were "draconian" and lacked a justifiable public health endgame. He added that China should instead focus on improving poor vaccination rates among its elderly population.

==== International organizations ====
- European Union: A European Union foreign policy spokesperson said that the EU was following the protests closely without additional comment.
- United Nations: Jeremy Laurence, spokesperson for the UN Human Rights Office, called on Chinese authorities to respect the right to peaceful protest and that protesters should not be arrested for exercising that right.

==== Multinational corporations ====
- Apple Inc.: An update to Apple's mobile operating system on 9 November restricted the company's AirDrop feature in China. The update automatically turns off sharing for anyone outside the user's contacts after 10 minutes, making it more difficult to widely share protest images in China. On 5 December, Chinese activists began a hunger strike outside Apple's headquarters in Cupertino, California, demanding that AirDrop restrictions be lifted.

== Aftermath ==
On 7 December 2022, the Chinese government lifted most of the most stringent rules, reducing lockdowns and allowing people tested positive for COVID-19 to quarantine at home instead of being detained in a hospital or mass quarantine site; these changes effectively led to the end of the zero-COVID policy. The central and several local governments dropped requirements for a negative test to enter public transport or parks, while retaining the testing and quarantine requirements for international arrivals. Pharmacies were allowed to sell anti-fever cold medications previously restricted in fear of circumventing temperature checks.

An analysis by the Council on Foreign Relations (CFR) concluded that while the protests were likely not the sole determining factor for the change in government policy, they contributed to the speed of the government's decision. Economic issues caused by zero-COVID policies, including a slowing of economic growth and fears of harming China's global supply chains, were also identified by CFR to be a significant factor for the government.

=== Effects on civic engagement ===
Within the first ten days of 2023, protests had already been held targeting a diverse array of citizen concerns, from a province-wide ban on fireworks in Henan, to workers' rights at a COVID-19 test factory in Chongqing, and consumer protections at Tesla showrooms and distribution centers throughout China. Although local demonstrations regarding disconnected and disparate issues had occurred regularly in the past, the overall eagerness on behalf of some segments of the Chinese population to take public action on a variety of different causes has led some commentators to posit that the COVID-19 lockdown protests have led to a subtle societal shift toward the acceptability of public assembly to achieve policy aims.

During smaller protests related to local fireworks bans in cities and towns across other parts of China, some local authorities caved to popular demand and repealed bans, particularly since some citizens saw the New Year's fireworks celebrations as a release of pent-up frustrations stemming from the lockdown period.

=== 2023 healthcare reform protests ===
Protests erupted in Wuhan and Dalian on 15 February 2023, in response to new health insurance reforms related to ongoing struggles within China's healthcare system and cash-strapped localities struggling to recover from zero-COVID expenditures. Most of the demonstrators were elderly citizens who opposed recent changes to the local healthcare insurance system, claiming that the reforms would make medical care more costly and reduce their access to it.

=== Legal action for sharing videos of protests ===
In June 2023, the Chinese Ministry of Foreign Affairs confirmed that a Uyghur university student, Kamile Wayit, was sentenced to prison for sharing videos of the protests on WeChat under the crime of "advocating extremism."

== See also ==
- Rightful resistance, a technique used in these protests
- 2019–2020 Hong Kong protests
  - Tactics and methods surrounding the 2019–2020 Hong Kong protests
- Open Letter asking Xi Jinping to Resign
- 1989 Tiananmen Square protests and massacre
