= 2022 Ürümqi fire =

High-rise fire in Xinjiang, China

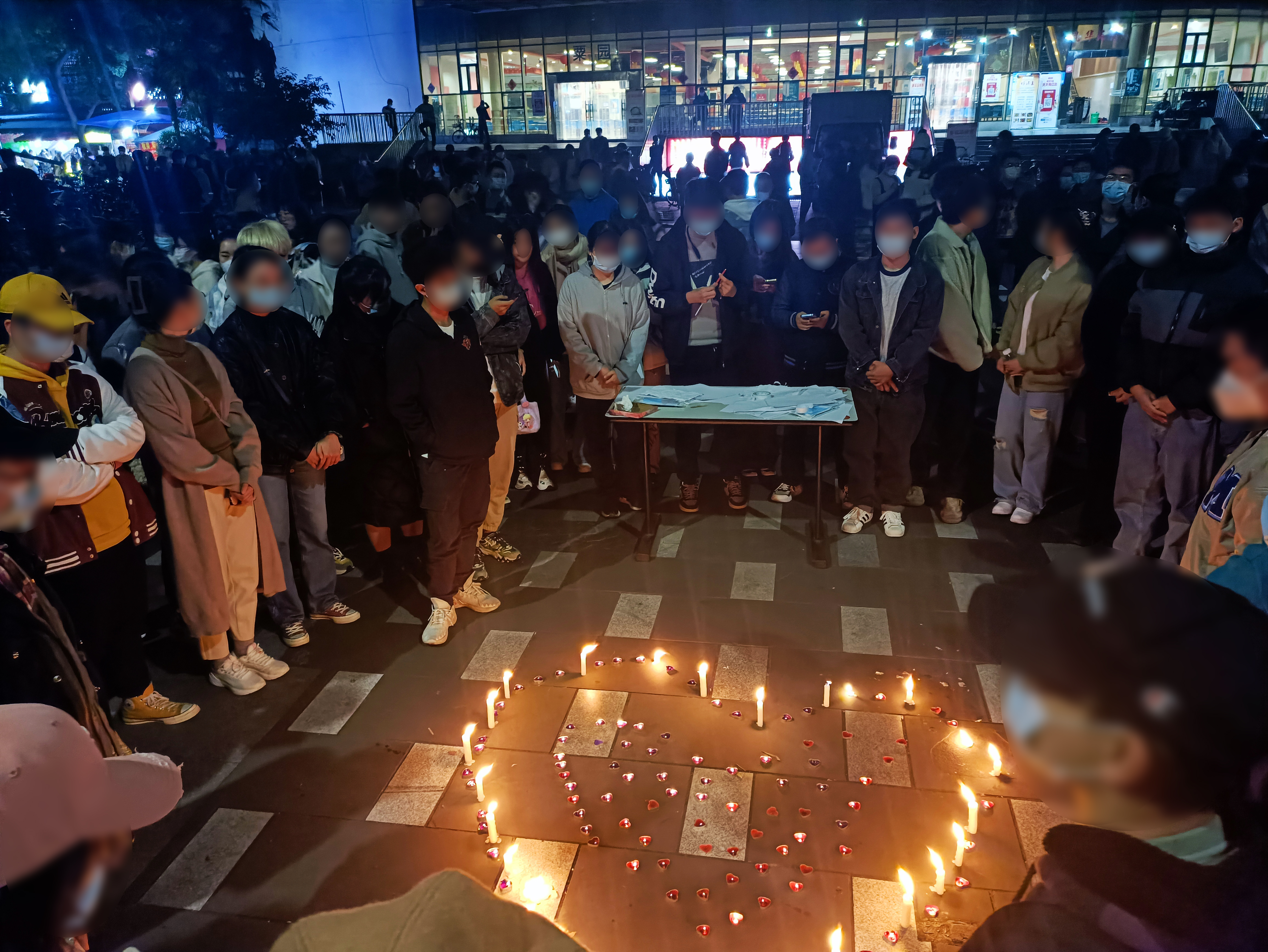
- Students of Southwest Jiaotong University mourn the victims of the Ürümqi fire
- Date: 24 November 2022
- Location: Ürümqi, Xinjiang, China; 43°46′49″N 87°37′08″E
- Cause: Sparks from an electric socket on a power strip
- Deaths: 10
- Injuries: 9

On 24 November 2022, a fire broke out in a residential high-rise apartment building in a Uyghur-majority neighborhood in Ürümqi, Xinjiang, China. Local authorities reported ten people, all Uyghurs, were dead and an additional nine were injured, though some raised concerns of underreporting.

Journalists raised questions of whether Beijing's strict enforcement of the zero-COVID policy prevented residents from leaving the building or interfered with the efforts of firefighters. Chinese authorities have denied these claims. The fire has been called a trigger of protests in several cities across China and in several other countries, targeting the Chinese government's zero-COVID policy, but in several instances also called for an end to Chinese Communist Party (CCP)'s one-party rule and for general secretary Xi Jinping to step down.

== Background ==
Ürümqi is the capital city of Xinjiang, home to the Uyghur population. Since August 2022, COVID-19 has spread to many parts of Xinjiang, and the local government had formulated several epidemic prevention policies in response, such as lockdowns and mandatory testing. Before the fire, the Jixiangyuan community (Chinese: 吉祥苑社区) where the accident occurred was designated a "low-risk area", and residents could leave for one to two hours each day while having to stay at home for the remainder of the day. It was unclear whether people were allowed to leave their compounds.

== Fire ==
On 24 November 2022, at around 7:49 p.m. (11:49 a.m. GMT), a fire broke out on the 15th floor of a 21-storey apartment building known as Jixiangyuan community building 8, unit 2, room 1502.

An investigation discovered that resident Ayshem Memeteli (Chinese: 阿依仙木·買買提艾力) was steam showering in the bathroom, which tripped the circuit breaker. After Ayshem reset the breaker, her daughter noticed sparks from an electric socket on a power strip. The sparks quickly ignited wallpapers, bed linen, and furniture. Despite some firefighting efforts by community worker Deng Mingxing (Chinese: 鄧明星) and neighbors from the 14th floor, the fire spread out of control. They notified the fire department and evacuated to the ground floor. Officials said a fireproof door on the 14th floor had been left open, which allowed the fire to spread.

Cars parked in the Jixiangyuan community and bollards reportedly blocked the fire trucks. Video footage posted to social media showed firetrucks unable to get close to the building, and water from the fire engines only barely reached the structure. Other posted videos were reported to have recorded the screams of those trapped in the fire.

According to electrician Eli Sultan (Chinese: 艾力·苏力), who serves the Jixiangyuan community, the residential compound lacked sufficient roadway for fire engines to pass, as a critical rescue passageway was blocked by fences and bollards for traffic control, which he claimed was unrelated to COVID-19 measures. According to the local fire department captain Xu Baoyong (Chinese: 徐宝勇), he had to remove many bollards to let the fire truck get close to the building.

The fire was extinguished 3½ hours later, around 10:35 p.m. XJT time (2:35 p.m. GMT). Ten people, all Uyghurs, were reported to have died in the fire, including a three-year-old child, and a further nine were injured, according to authorities.

== Aftermath ==
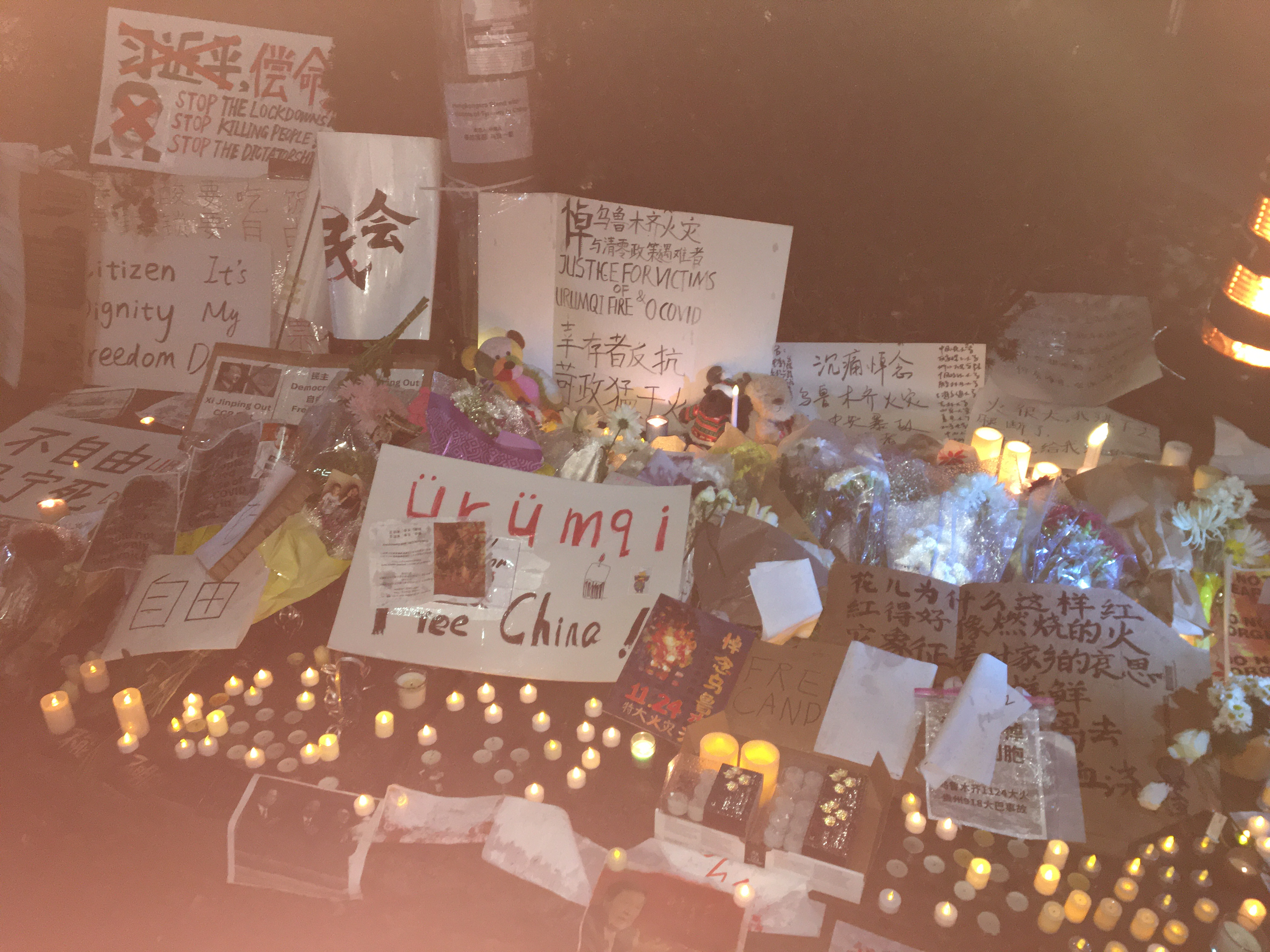
Vigil outside of the Chinese Consulate in Toronto, Canada, on 27 November

After the fire, vigils and protests were held in Xinjiang, Shanghai, Nanjing, and Beijing, criticizing the PRC government's zero-COVID policy, with some calling on CCP general secretary Xi Jinping to resign. Members of the public criticized the government's excessive epidemic prevention laws, which they suspect prevented firefighters from arriving at the scene.

Although the fire occurred in a Uyghur-majority neighborhood and the resulting deaths were all of Uyghurs, most of the protestors in Ürümqi were Han Chinese, a different ethnic group.

In the former French Concession neighborhood of Shanghai, protesters mourned the victims of the fire. They called for an end to the zero-COVID policy and for Xi Jinping to step down as leader.

In Beijing and Nanjing, protesters held up blank pieces of paper to mourn the victims of the fire as well as criticize the government's censorship policies. Protests also occurred at universities and colleges such as Tsinghua University, Peking University, and Sun Yat-sen University.

== Response ==
=== PRC government ===
Ürümqi mayor Memtimin Qadir apologized to the city's residents on the evening of 25 November during a press conference, and promised an investigation.

Li Wensheng, head of the Ürümqi City Fire Rescue Department, said that some residents' abilities to rescue themselves were "too weak" and that they had "failed to escape in time". Political scientist Dali Yang from the University of Chicago proposed that the comments by authorities on residents having been able to go downstairs and escape may have further fuelled public anger for having been perceived as victim blaming.

On 27 November 2022, Xinjiang officials promised to ease the lockdown measures without acknowledging the existence of the protest.

=== Uyghur emigrant community ===
Washington-based Uyghur academic Tahir Imin told The New York Times that the fire department response was terrible, and the fire was not under control for three hours despite having available facilities and equipment.

Abdulhafiz Maimaitimin, a Uyghur exile living in Switzerland, told journalists his aunt, Qemernisa Abdurahman (also transliterated as Haiernishahan Abdureheman), and four family members in the mainland of China were not rescued in time due to living in a Uyghur-majority neighborhood. They also raised concerns that the number of victims was being underreported by PRC officials.

Merhaba Muhammad, a Uyghur emigrant living in Turkey, is also a relative of Abdurahman. She told Newsweek that she lost contact with her family in 2016, after she left Xinjiang for international study. She claimed more than 44 people had died in the fire, citing her social media circles. She also expressed a belief that the local authorities did not prioritize saving her family because they were Uyghurs.

Mohammad and Sharapat Mohammad Ali, also relatives of Abdurahman living in Turkey, expressed their grief over the accident.

== See also ==
- 2002 Mecca girls' school fire – Incident in Saudi Arabia
- Cavan Orphanage fire – 1943 deadly fire at St. Joseph's Orphanage in Cavan, Ireland
