= Blank paper protest =

Subversive symbol

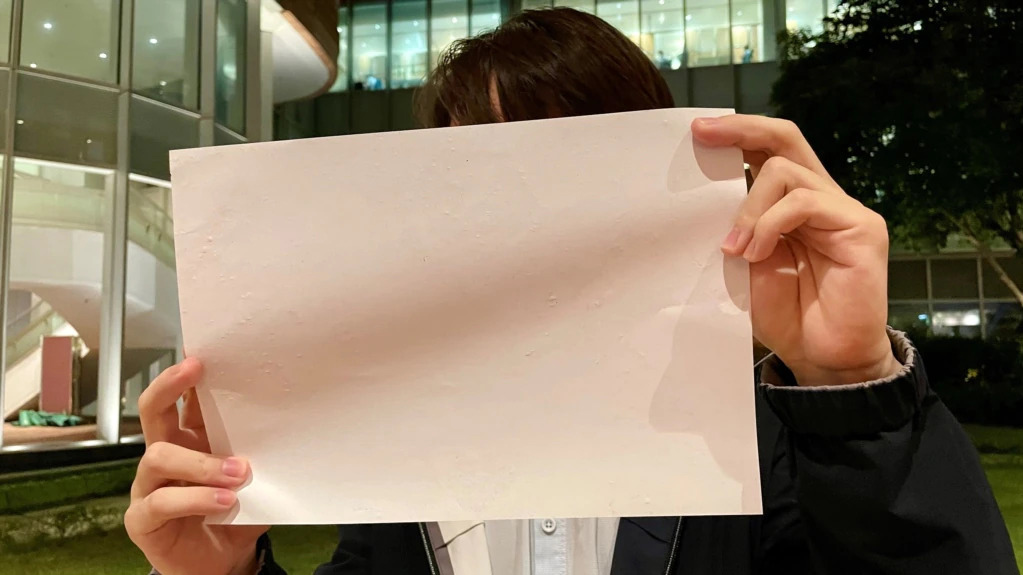
A blank piece of A4 paper, held up in protest by a student at Hong Kong University

Blank pieces of paper, posters and placards have been used as a form of protest. The message sent by such a protest is meant to be implicit and understood, but the lack of writing and slogans on the paper itself is designed to thwart efforts by authorities to prove that their prohibitions and regulations have been violated.

Early examples occurred in the 1960s when protests became common. In 2022, the symbol was used in several countries, especially China.

== Canada ==
A "Protest for Nothing" was held at University of Toronto Schools (UTS) in 1969. The protestors' placards were blank and their list of demands was a blank sheet of paper.

== China ==
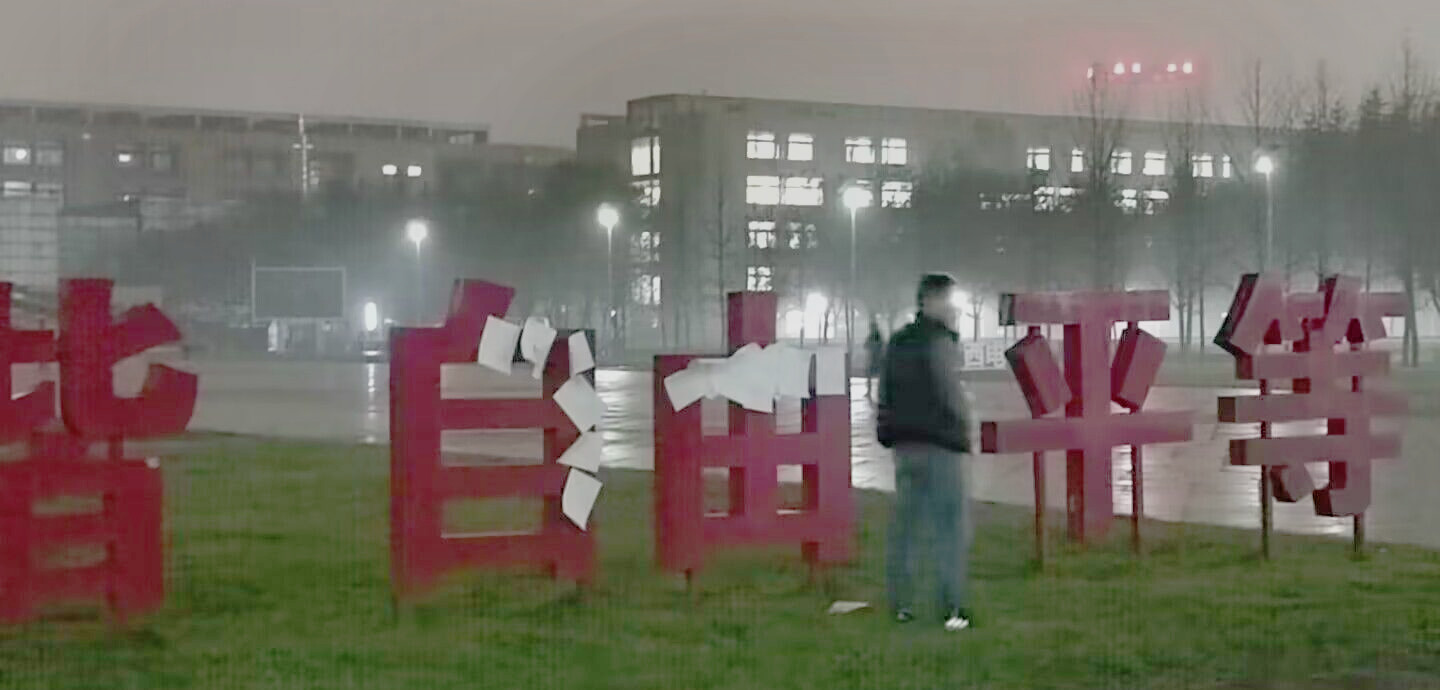
Blank pieces of paper stuck to the characters "自由" ("Freedom"), part of the Core Socialist Values slogan board at Xidian University

The use of a blank sheet of paper was prevalent during the 2022 COVID-19 protests in China as a symbol of Chinese censorship. It was first used in the 2019–2020 Hong Kong protests to protest the passing of the Hong Kong national security law after slogans and phrases associated with the protests were banned. The terms "blank sheet of paper" and "white paper" were also removed from online search results by Chinese censors.

White paper has additional significance in China because white is a symbol of death and colour of mourning.

== Poland ==
In 1924, a newspaper in Kraków responded to official censorship by including blank sheets of paper as a special supplement. These were confiscated and a court upheld the seizure on the grounds that they had ridiculed the authorities "without presenting definite facts".

== Russia ==
A Soviet political joke describes a disgruntled man holding up a white piece of paper in the street in protest and, when asked why, the protester replies that everyone knows what the paper is supposed to say.

Protestors in the anti-war protests in Russia that followed the 2022 Russian invasion of Ukraine were arrested for holding up blank paper.

== United Kingdom ==
Blank pieces of paper were used in protests that followed the death of Elizabeth II in September 2022. At St Giles' Cathedral in Edinburgh, protestors held up blank sheets of paper to protest the arrest of anti-monarchy demonstrators. In London, a barrister who held up a blank piece of paper in Parliament Square was asked for his details by Metropolitan Police officers, and told that he would be arrested under the Public Order Act if he wrote "Not My King" on the paper.

In February 2023 in Cornwall, a man holding a blank piece of paper at a visit of Prince William and Catherine (Prince and Princess of Wales) was detained by police.

== United States ==
In 1965, the reality television series Candid Camera staged "Picketing Against Everything With Nothing" in the Bronx. The setting was an empty, snow-covered lot and the picketers had blank placards and distributed blank handbills.

In 1970, Anna Halprin organised a "Blank Placard Dance" by members of her San Francisco Dancers' Workshop. They paraded, dressed in white, while holding blank placards. She explained, "...there were so many protests going on and this way each person watching us could just imagine whatever protest slogan they wanted on the placards."

== See also ==
- Anonymous mask
- Blackout Tuesday
- Blank book
- Dumb insolence
- Silent protest
- Social and political movements of the 1960s
- Tabula rasa
- Vertical banner
