= Core Socialist Values =

Chinese Communist Party ideology and slogan

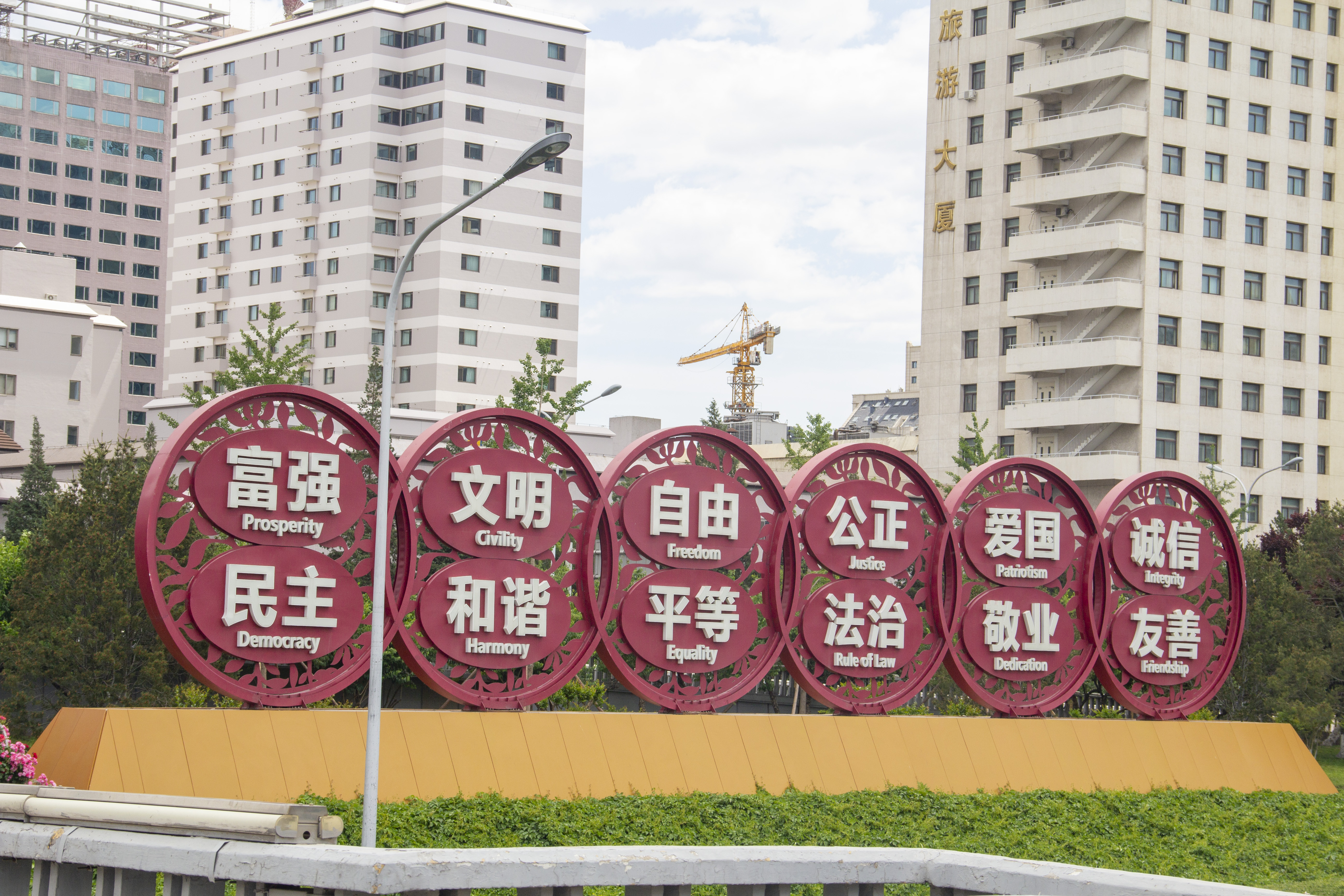
- Statue listing the twelve Core Socialist Values of the Chinese Communist Party
- Simplified Chinese: 社会主义核心价值观
- Traditional Chinese: 社會主義核心價值觀
Transcriptions
Standard Mandarin
- Hanyu Pinyin: Shèhuì zhǔyì héxīn jiàzhíguān
- Wade–Giles: Shê-hui chu-yi ho-hsin chia-chih-kuan
Yue: Cantonese
- Yale Romanization: Séhkūi zyūjìh hàhtsàm gáazìhkgùn
Southern Min
- Hokkien POJ: Siā-hōe Chú-gī hu̍t-sim kè ta̍t koan

The Core Socialist Values is a set of official interpretations of the Chinese Communist Party's ideology of socialism with Chinese characteristics promoted at its 18th National Congress in 2012. The 12 values, written in 24 Chinese characters, are the national values of "prosperity", "democracy", "civility" and "harmony"; the social values of "freedom", "equality", "justice" and the "rule of law"; and the individual values of "patriotism", "dedication", "integrity" and "friendship". (Note: "Friendship", which in the Chinese original is 友善, is more closely translated as "friendliness" or "amicability". In other words, the word normally refers to a personal attitude, not a type of interpersonal relationship.)

== Background ==
In 1989, paramount leader Deng Xiaoping stated in a speech that he considered education to be the biggest reform failure of the 1980s, and in particular ideological and political education. The government had tried to effect mass campaigns to this end, but these would not ultimately be regarded as effective. The Death of Wang Yue in 2011 might be considered an instigator for a new program. In 2012, the building of a system of "Core Socialist Values" was proposed to address what was perceived as a moral crisis resulting from China's rapid economic development, which the People's Daily refers to as the "decayed, outdated ideals of mammonism and extreme individualism."

At the 18th National Congress, Party general secretary Hu Jintao represented the 17th Central Committee and presented the content of the new values that are intended to be enshrined by the Chinese Communist Party (CCP). A quote from CCP general secretary Xi Jinping at the 18th National Congress says:

If our 1.3 billion citizens and 82 million Party members as well as overseas Chinese can achieve consensus, we will constitute a powerful force [...] We must realize that people from different localities and social strata who have different backgrounds and occupations think differently. We must therefore consider: where can we find consensus? Where can we allow differences to persist?

In 2017, Xi stated:

Without morals, a country cannot thrive, and its people cannot stand upright. Whether or not a nation or an individual has a strong sense of identity largely depends on their morals. If our people cannot uphold the moral values that have been formed and developed on our own soil, and instead indiscriminately and blindly parrot Western moral values, then it will be necessary to genuinely question whether we will lose our independent ethos as a country and a people. Without this independent ethos, our political, intellectual, cultural and institutional independence will have the rug pulled out from under it.

== List of Values ==
The twelve Core Socialist Values are:

National values

- Prosperity (Chinese: 富强; pinyin: fùqiáng)
- Democracy (Chinese: 民主; pinyin: mínzhǔ)
- Civility (Chinese: 文明; pinyin: wénmíng)
- Harmony (Chinese: 和谐; pinyin: héxié)

Social values

- Freedom (Chinese: 自由; pinyin: zìyóu)
- Equality (Chinese: 平等; pinyin: píngděng)
- Justice (Chinese: 公正; pinyin: gōngzhèng)
- Rule of law (Chinese: 法治; pinyin: fǎzhì)

Individual values

- Patriotism (Chinese: 爱国; pinyin: àiguó)
- Dedication (Chinese: 敬业; pinyin: jìngyè)
- Integrity (Chinese: 诚信; pinyin: chéngxìn)
- Friendship (Chinese: 友善; pinyin: yǒushàn)

== Program ==
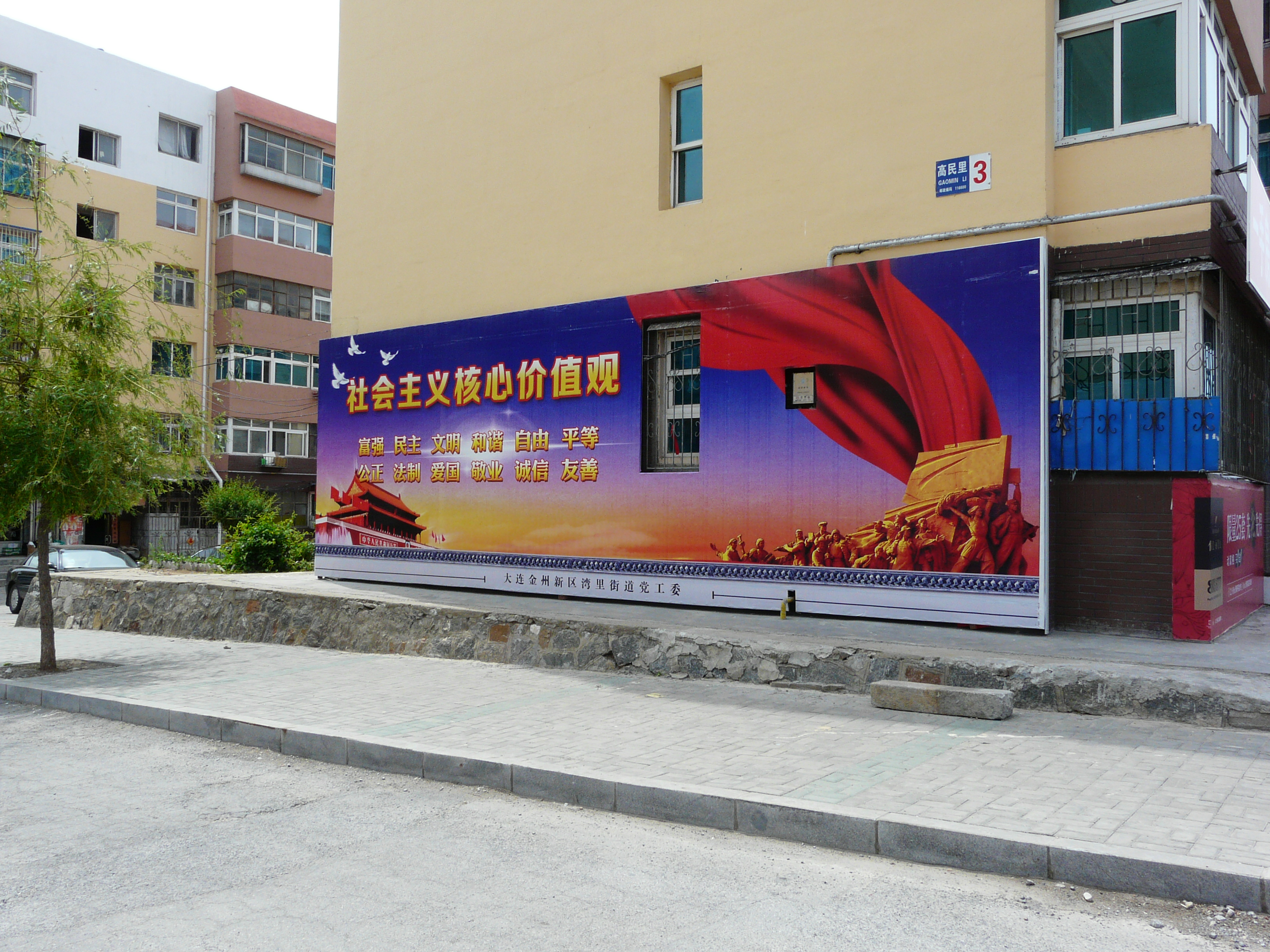
A poster in Dalian promoting the twelve Core Socialist Values.

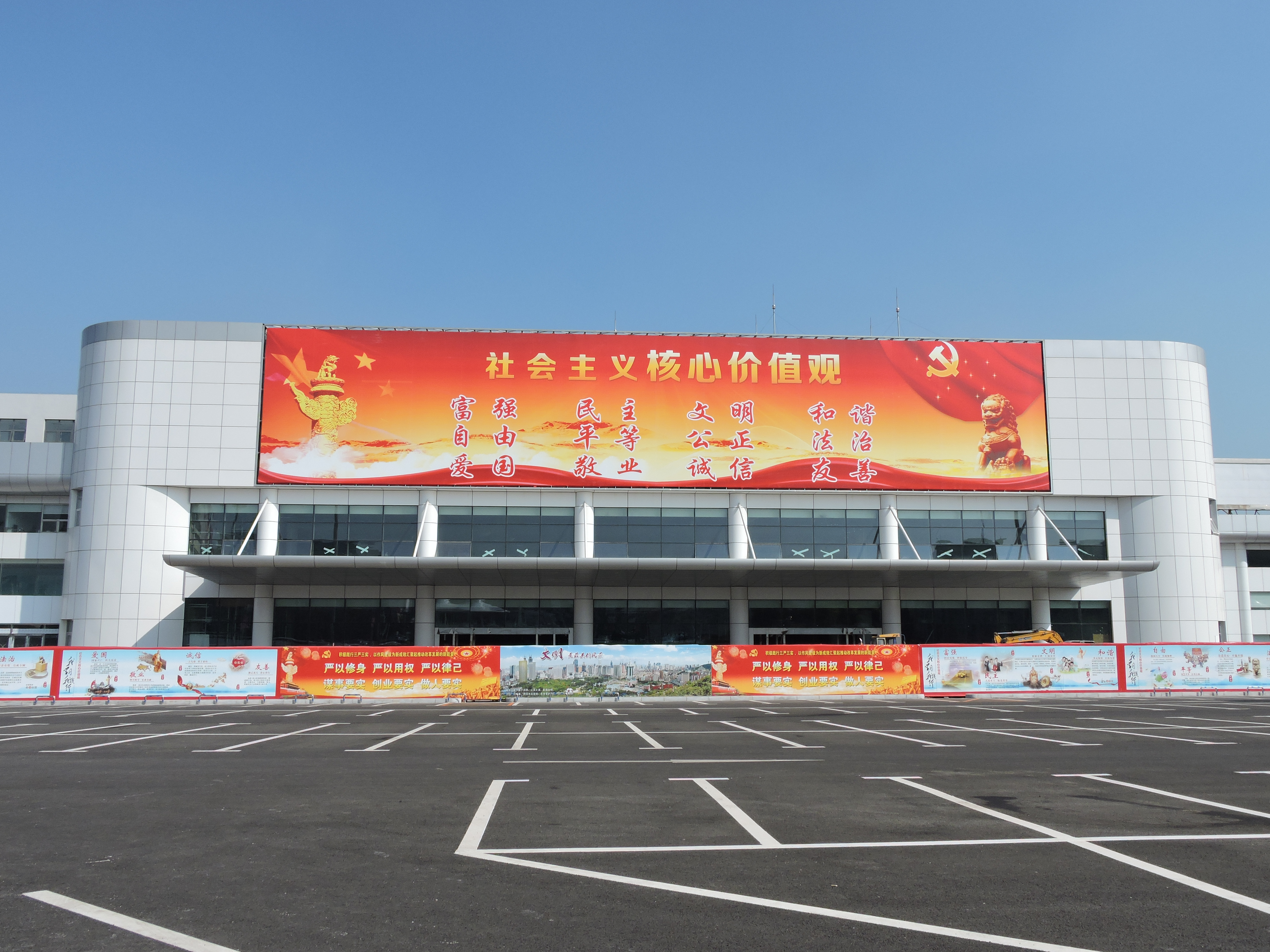
Giant poster listing the twelve Core Socialist Values of the Chinese Communist Party (2017).

The program called for the local governments to "organize moral education campaigns", and for media organizations to "practice self-discipline". In addition, artists were asked to promote the values, while party members and state officials are expected to put these new values in practice. It also called on schools to incorporate them, with the Ministry of Education issuing a document in 2014 requesting all educational institutions promote them. Xi Jinping expressed in a high-level meeting that promotional campaigns for 'Core Socialist Values' should be thorough, to the extent that public support for Chinese-style socialism will be "as ubiquitous as the air". Another quote from 2014 further elaborates his position:

We need to energetically foster and promote core socialist values; promptly establish a value system that fully reflects Chinese characteristics, our national identity, and the features of the times; and strive to occupy the leading position on this issue. Ethical values play a very important role among core values. Without morals, a country cannot thrive, and its people cannot stand upright. Whether or not a nation or an individual has a strong sense of identity largely depends on their morals. If our people cannot uphold the moral values that have been formed and developed on our own soil, and instead indiscriminately and blindly parrot Western moral values, then it will be necessary to genuinely question whether we will lose our independent ethos as a country and a people. Without this independent ethos, our political, intellectual, cultural and institutional independence will have the rug pulled out from under it.

The 2015 National Security Law's article on cultural security requires the state to uphold socialist core values.

In 2016, Hunan Province officials responded to the campaign by organizing a series of dance routines to "spread the values" and express their support for the CCP.

In June 2017, the State Administration of Press, Publication, Radio, Film and Television issued several notices that intended to further restrict freedom of the press. One of the notices, with a patriotic bent, demanded broadcasters promote core values in their programs and "forcefully oppose" content that celebrates "money worship, hedonism, radical individualism and feudal thought."

== Reception ==
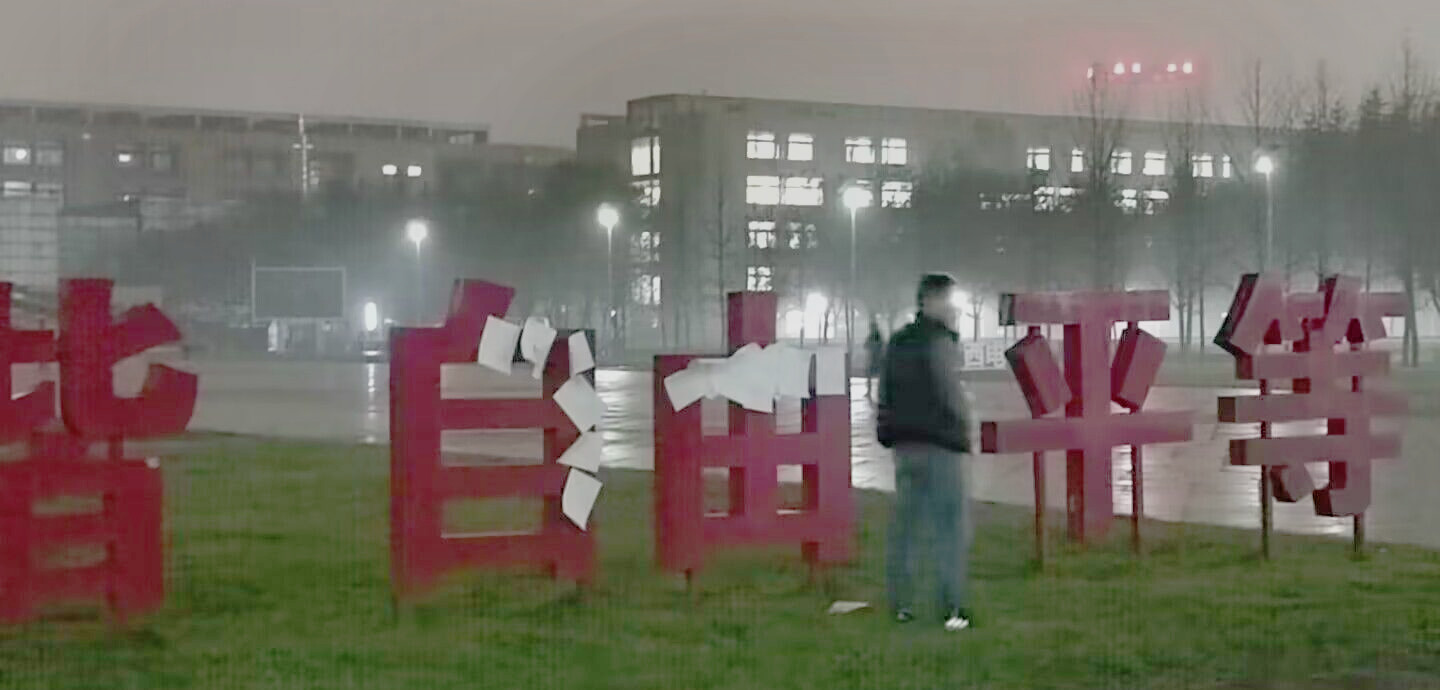
Blank pieces of paper stuck to the characters "自由" ("Freedom"), part of the Core Socialist Values, on the slogan board at Xidian University, in a November 2022 protest

Shiyuan Hao considers the program of "great significance" for a "multi-national country like China", and for the creation of both a "harmonious culture" and a "creative breeding ground" for cultural diversity.

Michael Gow considers that, compelled to align its interests with the "broader interests of the Chinese people and different groups", the program for Core Socialist Values might best be analyzed as a shift from a focus on the economy to cultural power; or, if one wished to extrapolate, an attempt to cement legitimacy through the creation of a new cultural order, consent to which might be regarded as "essential for long-term social stability".

Liu Ruisheng, a researcher of the Chinese Academy of Social Sciences School of Journalism, criticizes the governments attempts more generally as simply lacking the same depth of value promotion in the west, which is "concealed" in the social sciences, education, religion, and entertainment, whereas the CCP presents ideology ad hoc. He is still pro-CCP however.

Frank N. Pieke refers to the values as Confucian and as otherwise lacking any specifically socialist content, but then as Michael Gow points out most Chinese do share a "broadly accepted, common-sense understanding of Confucian values."

== See also ==
- Chinese Dream
- Eight Honors and Eight Shames
- Xi Jinping Thought
- Three Principles of the People
