= Canyu =

China-focused pro-democracy website

- Available in: Chinese
- Headquarters: {{{location_country}}}
- Website: www.canyu.org
- Launched: 2005
- Current status: Offline

Canyu
- Traditional Chinese: 參與
- Simplified Chinese: 参与
Transcriptions
Standard Mandarin
- Hanyu Pinyin: Cānyǔ

Canyu (traditional Chinese: 參與; simplified Chinese: 参与; pinyin: Cānyǔ), also known as Participation or Participation Network, was a United States-based rights protection and pro-democracy website, focusing on China's democracy movement, human rights situation, and commentary critical of the Chinese Communist Party.

== History ==
Canyu.org was launched in 2005 and was maintained by the China Free Press. Due to the stand of the website, it received many cyberattacks made by hackers. In January 2014, Canyu issued a statement stating that the website had been funded by the National Endowment for Democracy from 2005 to September 30, 2012. As of January 2021, the website was down.

== Hack ==
In January 2010, Canyu was hit by DDoS attacks, which prevented access to the website and resulted in the violation and destruction of the background data. In December 2016, canyu.org was hacked again by DDoS attacks.
