= Statistics of the COVID-19 pandemic in China =

This article presents official statistics gathered during the COVID-19 pandemic in mainland China.

The case count in mainland China only includes symptomatic cases. It excludes patients who test positive but do not have symptoms, of which there were 889 as of 11 February 2020. Asymptomatic infections are reported separately. It is also reported that there were more than 43,000 by the end of February 2020. On 17 April, following the Wuhan government's issuance of a report on accounting for COVID-19 deaths that occurred at home that went previously unreported, as well as the subtraction of deaths that were previously double-counted by different hospitals, the NHC retrospectively revised their cumulative totals dating to 16 April, adding 325 cumulative cases and 1,290 deaths.

Around March 2020, there was speculation that China's COVID numbers were deliberately inaccurate, but as of 2021, China's COVID elimination strategy was considered to have been successful and its statistics were considered to be accurate.

By December 2022, the Chinese central government had changed its definition of reported death statistics to only include cases in which COVID-19 directly caused respiratory failure, which led to skepticism by health experts of the government's total death count. The same month, the municipal health chief of Qingdao reported "between 490,000 and 530,000" new COVID-19 cases per day.

China was part of a small group of countries such as Taiwan, Australia, New Zealand, and Singapore that pursued a zero-COVID strategy. The Chinese government's strategy involved extensive testing, mask wearing, temperature checks, ventilation, contact tracing, quarantines, isolation of infected people, and heavy restrictions in response to local outbreaks.

On December 25, 2022, the Chinese government's National Health Commission announced that it would no longer publish daily COVID-19 data. In January 2023, the World Health Organization stated, "We believe that the current numbers being published from China under-represent the true impact of the disease in terms of hospital admissions, in terms of ICU admissions, and particularly in terms of deaths."

== Timeline ==
Cases

Deaths

== Charts ==
=== 2020 cumulative and daily cases graph ===
Data is from the Chinese National Health Commission.

== By province ==
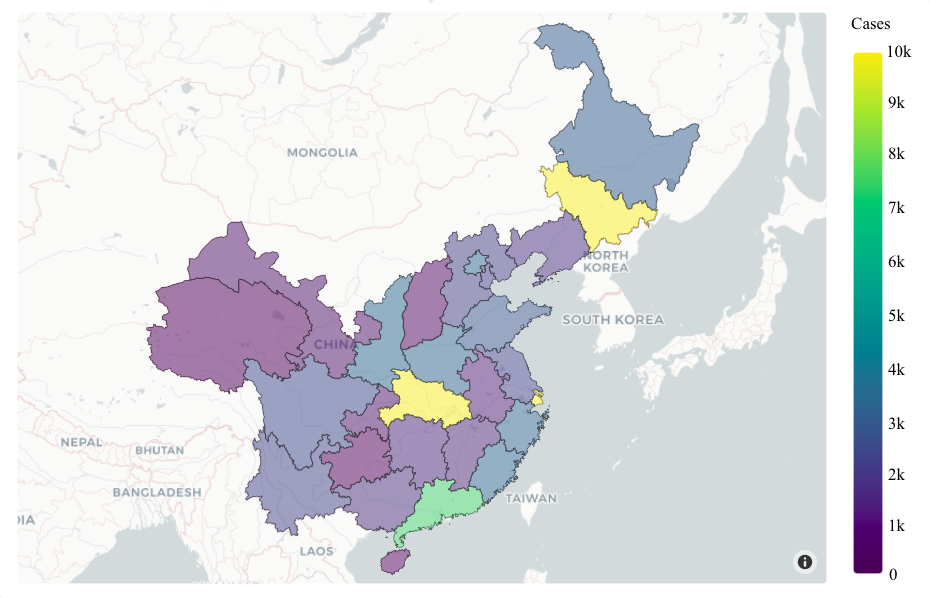
Map of total Covid-19 cases across Chinese provinces between 2020-01-23 and 2022-06-01

COVID-19 pandemic in mainland China by provinces Data released by Chinese provinces as of 24:00 (UTC+8) 5 July 2021
Chinese provinces	Pop. (mil.) (2019)	Cases	Deaths	Fatality	Recov.	Active	Cases /1M pop	Deaths /1M pop	Ref.
China (mainland)	1,400.0500	86,338	4,634	5.37	81,319	385	61.67	3.31	
Hubei	59.2700	68,148	4,512	6.62	63,627	9	1,149.8	76.13	
——Wuhan, Hubei	11.2120	50,340	3,869	7.69	46,471	0	4,489.8	345.08	
Guangdong	115.2100	1,963	8	0.41	1,922	33	17.0	0.07	
Zhejiang	58.5000	1,291	1	0.08	1,279	11	22.1	0.02	
Henan	96.4000	1,288	22	1.71	1,259	7	13.4	0.23	
Shanghai	24.2814	1,277	7	0.55	1,174	96	52.6	0.29	
Hunan	69.1838	1,020	4	0.39	1,015	1	14.7	0.06	
Anhui	63.6590	992	6	0.60	985	1	15.6	0.09	
Xinjiang	25.2322	980	3	0.31	952	25	38.8	0.12	
Heilongjiang	37.5130	949	13	1.37	936	0	25.3	0.35	
Jiangxi	46.6610	935	1	0.11	934	0	20.0	0.02	
Beijing	21.5360	947	9	0.95	932	6	44.0	0.42	
Shandong	100.7021	848	7	0.83	841	0	8.4	0.07	
Sichuan	83.7500	783	3	0.38	735	45	9.3	0.04	
Jiangsu	80.7000	676	0	0	666	10	8.4	0	
Chongqing	31.2432	589	6	1.02	582	1	18.9	0.19	
Shaanxi	38.7621	484	3	0.62	438	43	12.5	0.08	
Fujian	39.7300	461	1	0.22	423	37	11.6	0.03	
Hebei	75.9197	373	6	1.61	362	5	4.9	0.08	
Inner Mongolia	25.3960	307	1	0.33	282	24	12.1	0.04	
Tianjin	15.6183	289	3	1.04	266	20	18.5	0.19	
Liaoning	43.5170	288	2	0.69	280	6	6.6	0.05	
Guangxi	49.6000	260	2	0.77	258	0	5.2	0.04	
Shanxi	37.2922	218	0	0	213	5	5.8	0	
Yunnan	48.5830	217	2	0.92	209	6	4.5	0.04	
Hainan	9.4472	171	6	3.51	165	0	18.1	0.64	
Gansu	26.4743	181	2	1.10	177	2	6.8	0.08	
Jilin	26.9073	157	2	1.27	155	0	5.8	0.07	
Guizhou	36.2295	147	2	1.36	145	0	4.1	0.06	
Ningxia	6.9466	75	0	0	75	0	10.8	0	
Qinghai	6.0782	18	0	0	18	0	2.96	0	
Tibet	3.5056	1	0	0	1	0	0.29	0	

== By city ==
2019–21 coronavirus pandemic by mainland Chinese city/prefecture

Hold cursor over location to display name; click to go to location article.

No active cases Confirmed Imported (Note: Cities under "Imported" category has only active cases that are imported from outside Mainland China. In other words, there are currently no active local cases in these cities.) First outbreak of pandemic (no active cases)

As of 5 July 2021, there have been 2951 total (200 active) imported cases in mainland China, with no deaths recorded among them:

- Anhui: 1 total imported case (all recovered).
- Beijing: 176 total imported cases (1 active).
- Chongqing: 9 total imported cases (1 active).
- Fujian: 118 total imported cases (14 active (Note: FJ: 33 in Fuzhou, 61 in Xiamen, 22 in Quanzhou, 1 in Zhangzhou, 1 in Ningde; 104 additional recovered: Specific location to be clarified.)).
- Gansu: 78 total imported cases (all recovered).
- Guangdong: 452 total imported cases (25 active (Note: GD: 25 (active) in Guangzhou, 3 (active) in Zhanjiang, 1 (active) in Foshan; 4 additional recovered: Specific location to be clarified.)).
- Guangxi: 8 total imported cases (3 active (Note: GX: Specific location not differentiated.)).
- Guizhou: 1 total imported case (all recovered).
- Hebei: 26 total imported cases (1 active (Note: HE: Specific location not differentiated.)).
- Heilongjiang: 387 total imported cases (all recovered).
- Henan: 8 total imported cases (4 active (Note: HA: Specific location not differentiated.)).
- Hunan: 1 total imported case (all recovered).
- Inner Mongolia: 191 total imported cases (6 active (Note: NM: Specific location not differentiated.)).
- Jiangsu: 22 total imported cases (all recovered).
- Jiangxi: 2 total imported cases (all recovered). (Note: JX: 2 in Nanchang).
- Jilin: 19 total imported cases (3 active) (Note: JL: 4 (0 active) in Changchun, 1 (0 active) in Meihekou, 12 (3 active) in Jilin City, 2 (0 active) in Yanbian).
- Liaoning: 21 total imported cases (all recovered).
- Shaanxi: 63 total imported cases (8 active).
- Shandong: 25 total imported cases (2 active).
- Shanghai: 321 total imported cases (22 active).
- Shanxi: 64 total imported cases (all recovered).
- Sichuan: 21 total imported cases (all recovered) (Note: SC: 21 in Chengdu).
- Tianjin: 55 total imported cases (2 active).
- Yunnan: 11 total imported cases (all recovered).
- Zhejiang: 50 total imported cases (all recovered).

See "Notes" section below for imported cases details (all data are given out of total imported cases).

== Economic Performance ==
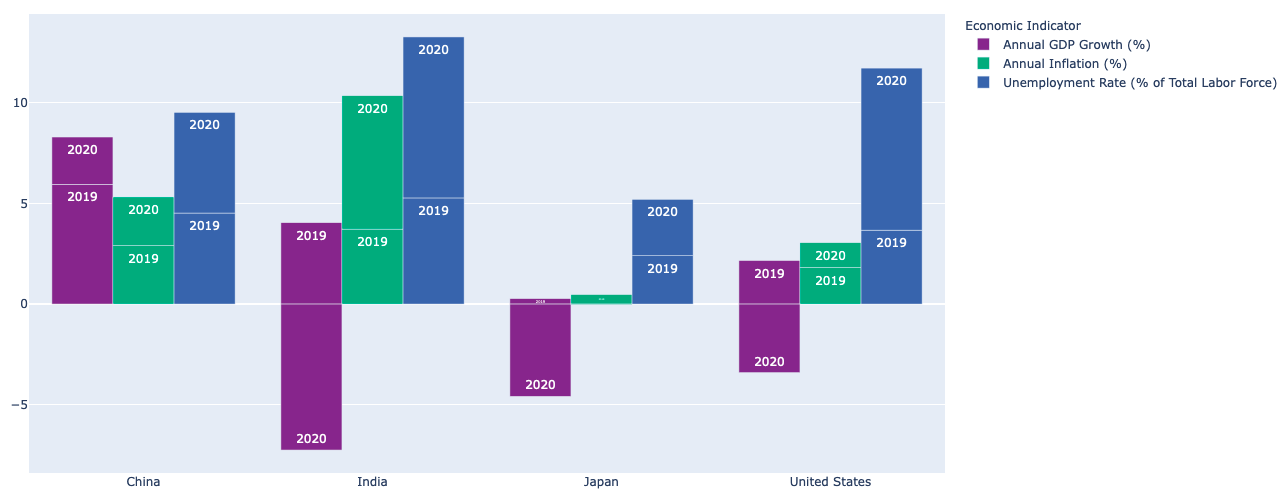
Comparison of Economic Indicators of China, India, Japan and the US during the Time of the Covid-19 Pandemic
