= Breaking Through =

Breaking Through may refer to:

- Breaking Through (1990 film), an Australian docudrama TV film
- Breaking Through (2015 film), an American-English dance drama film
- Breaking Through (2022 film), a Chinese sports drama film
- Breaking Through, 2026 album by American rock band Saliva
- Bre
