= Breaking Through (2022 film) =

2022 Chinese sports drama film

- Film poster
- Directed by: Wang Fangfang
- Screenplay by: Wang Fangfang; Wang Zhebin; He Keke
- Produced by: Liu Ruifang
- Starring: Meng Meiqi; Xia Yu
- Cinematography: Liu Yizeng
- Distributed by: Beijing Qitai Ocean Culture Media Co., Ltd. Beijing Juhe Yinglian Culture Media Co., Ltd.
- Release date: February 25, 2022 (China)
- Running time: 104 minutes
- Country: China
- Language: Mandarin
- Box office: (CN¥6.33 million)

Breaking Through (Chinese: 我心飞扬; pinyin: Wǒ xīn fēi yáng; trans. "Float in the Sky") is a 2022 Chinese sports drama film from director Wang Fangfang, and stars Meng Meiqi and Xia Yu. The film, which is based on true events of short-track speed skater Yang Yang, follows the Chinese national short-track speed skating team as they attempt to prevail in winning a gold medal at the 2002 Winter Olympics in Salt Lake City, Utah.

== Synopsis ==
In 1980, China participated in that year's Winter Olympic Games, where it failed to receive a gold medal. The country then contested several subsequent games, each time also failing to do so. For the 2002 Olympics, short speed skating coach Qin Shan (Xia Yu) forms the Chinese short-track speed skating national team with its representative being Yang Fan (Meng Meiqi).

== Cast ==
- Meng Meiqi as Yang Fan, Olympic short track speed skater and is based on the real life short-track speed skater Yang Yang
  - Liu Wenxi as 7-year old Yang Fan
- Xia Yu, as Qin Shan, short track speed skating coach of the Chinese team
- Pei Kuishan as Zhao Haibo
- Sa Rina as Jiang Hong, Yang Fan's mother
- Jiao Gang as Wu Ping
- Zhang Guoqiang as Jin Yalin
- Liang Wenhui as Yang Xin, Yang Fan's younger sister
- Li Muzi as Wu Haixia

== Production and pre-publicity ==
The film was announced by the film crew at a press conference on 26 September 2018. To prepare for their roles, the actors engaged in high-intensity training. In order to play the role of a short track speed skater, Meng Meiqi trained for four months in advance and gained 15 kg (33 lb) in order to be better match her role's physique, and to induce actual pain, she placed a rock inside of an ice skate, resulting in a bleeding foot.

Filming commenced on 2 March 2021 in the city of Qitaihe, Heilongjiang, and took place during the COVID-19 pandemic, with the Heilongjiang Provincial Party Committee's Propaganda Department providing assistance through location scouting, production safety and epidemic prevention and control. The film was shot in Northeast China at temperatures of −10 °C (14 °F). To present the summer training part of the film, the actresses wore short sleeves. Filming was completed on May 9 after 68 days and nights of shooting.

== Release ==
Initially intended to coincide with the first day of the Chinese New Year in 2022 (1 February), the film's release date was delayed, and on 22 February 2022, the film's final trailer revealed that the film would be released on 25 February 2022, five days after the closing ceremony of the 2022 Winter Olympics in Beijing. On 22 February, the film held its first premiere at that city's China National Film Museum, with subsequent screenings in Chongqing and Harbin taking place on 24 and 25 February. The film's official theme song My Heart is Flying (Chinese: 心飞扬; pinyin: Xīn fēi yáng) was sung by Meng Meiqi. Prior to its official release in China on 25 February 2022, it was estimated that the film would make ¥100 million in box office; however, by March 2022, the film had taken less than ¥6 million, prompting the Hong Kong news portal HK01 to brand the film a box office flop. The film was officially released in Nigeria in April 2023, and in Thailand and other countries in Southeast Asia in September 2023.

== Awards and nominations ==
Award	Date of ceremony	Category	Recipient(s)	Result	Ref.
Golden Deer Awards	August 2022	Best Screenplay	Wang Fangfang, Wang Zhebin	Nominated	
Milan International Sports Film and Television Festival	November 2022	Unit nomination (Film)	Breaking Through	Won	
