= COVID-19 pandemic in Henan =

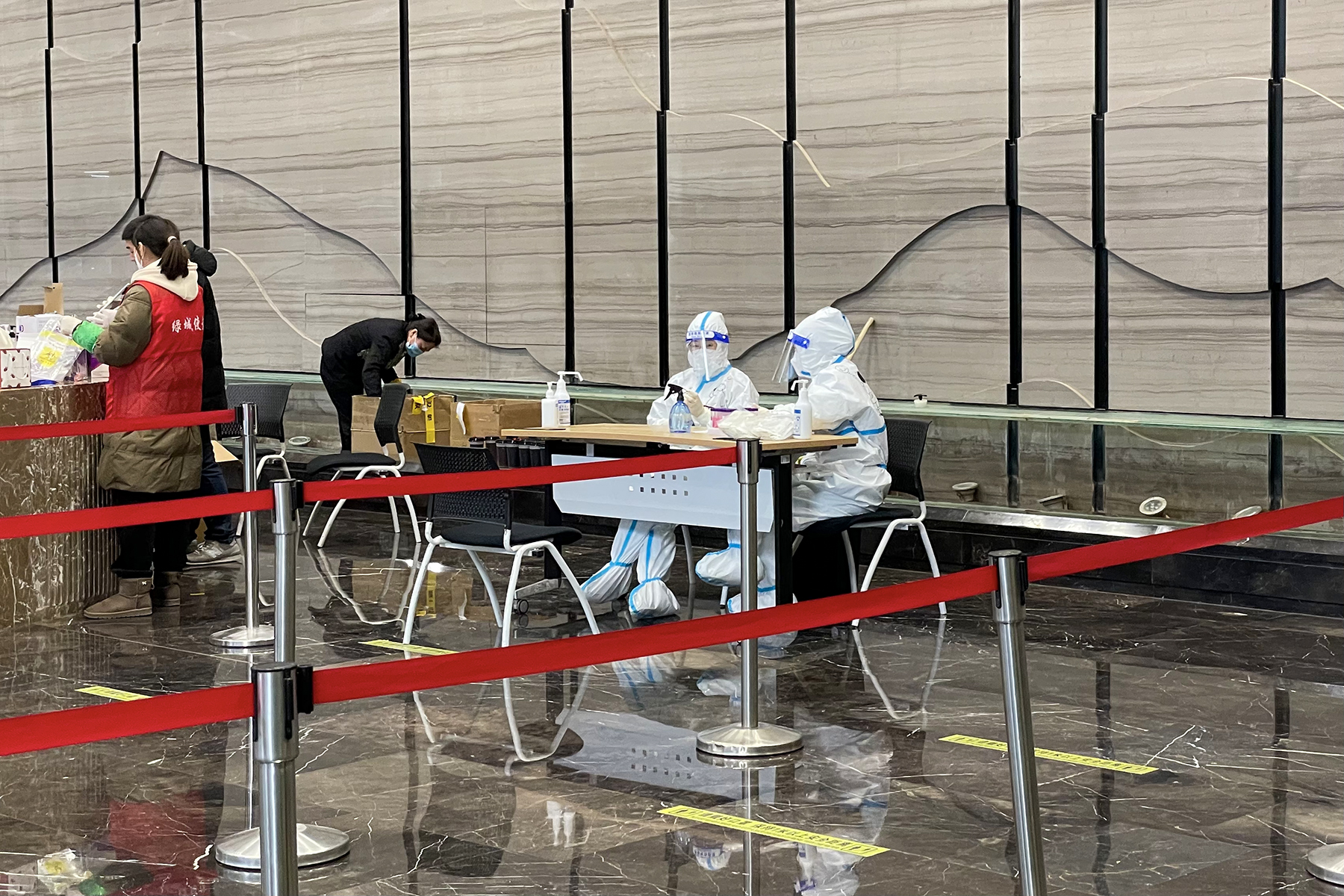
- Disease: COVID-19
- Pathogen: SARS-CoV-2
- Location: Henan, China
- First outbreak: Wuhan, Hubei
- Index case: Taikang County
- Arrival date: 21 January 2020 – present
- Confirmed cases: 1276
- Recovered: 1254
- Deaths: 23

The COVID-19 pandemic reached the province of Henan, China on 21 January 2020.

== Timeline ==
Division	Active	Confirmed	Deceased	Recovered
Henan	0	9,419	22	1254
Imported from abroad	14	139	0	125
Xinyang	0	297	2	272
Zhengzhou	12	6,205	5	483
Nanyang	0	162	3	153
Zhumadian	0	139	0	139
Shangqiu	0	116	3	88
Zhoukou	0	184	1	75
Pingdingshan	0	58	1	57
Xinxiang	0	57	3	54
Anyang	0	582	0	53
Xuchang	275	578	1	39
Luohe	0	35	0	35
Jiaozuo	0	32	1	31
Luoyang	0	31	1	30
Kaifeng	0	26	0	26
Hebi	0	19	0	19
Puyang	0	17	0	17
Sanmenxia	0	10	1	6
Jiyuan	0	10	0	5
As of 23 March 2020. (The number of confirmed cases include deceased and recovered ones.)

=== January 2020 ===
On January 21, 2020, one confirmed case was reported. A 66-year-old male from Taikang, Zhoukou, working in Wuhan. He developed symptoms on December 29, returned to Zhoukou on January 7, and was transferred to Zhengzhou on the 10th. He was isolated on the 20th and confirmed on the 21st.

On January 22, four new confirmed cases were notified. As of 18:00 on January 22, a total of 5 confirmed cases (2 in Zhengzhou, 1 in Luoyang, 1 in Sanmenxia, and 1 in Gongyi) have been confirmed. All cases have a history of residence in Wuhan, and are currently receiving isolation treatment at designated medical institutions.

On January 24, the Henan Provincial Health and Health Commission reported that four new cases were confirmed on January 23, one each in Zhoukou City, Xinyang City, Zhengzhou City, and Gongyi City, with Zhoukou City and Xinyang City reporting the first confirmed cases.

On January 25, the Henan Provincial Health and Health Commission reported that 23 new cases were confirmed on January 24, including 1 in Pingdingshan City, 1 in Xinxiang City, 8 in Nanyang City, 2 in Zhumadian City, 1 in Gushi County, Three cases were reported in Zhengzhou, three in Zhoukou, and four in Xinyang. The first confirmed cases were reported in Pingdingshan, Xinxiang, Nanyang, Zhumadian, and Gushi County.

On January 26, the Henan Provincial Health and Health Commission reported that 51 new cases were confirmed on January 25, including 3 in Anyang, 3 in Luohe, 12 in Zhengzhou, 1 in Pingdingshan, 2 in Xinxiang, and Sanmenxia. 1 case in Guangzhou, 1 case in Zhoukou, 5 cases in Zhumadian, 7 cases in Nanyang, and 16 cases in Xinyang.

On January 27, the Henan Provincial Health and Health Commission reported that 45 new cases were confirmed on January 26, including 1 in Kaifeng, 2 in Hebi, 1 in Xuchang, 6 in Shangqiu, 9 in Zhengzhou, and Luoyang. There were 1 case in Beijing, 3 cases in Pingdingshan City, 4 cases in Anyang City, 1 case in Xinxiang City, 3 cases in Luohe City, 1 case in Sanmenxia City, 4 cases in Nanyang City, 1 case in Xinyang City, 2 cases in Zhumadian City, and 6 cases in Zhoukou City (Kaifeng City, Hebi City, Xuchang City, and Shangqiu City reported the first confirmed case).

On January 28, the Henan Provincial Health and Health Commission informed that on January 27, 40 new cases were confirmed, 11 cases were severe, and 2 cases were critically ill. 2 cases in Jiaozuo (first report), 8 cases in Zhengzhou, 1 case in Kaifeng, 4 cases in Anyang, 2 cases in Xinxiang, 1 case in Xuchang, 3 cases in Luohe, 7 cases in Nanyang, 1 case in Shangqiu, 4 cases in Zhoukou City, 6 cases in Xinyang City, and 1 case in Zhumadian City. On the same day, Zhengzhou issued an emergency notice that a total of 23 patients infected with the novel coronavirus took arrived in Henan on 23 respective trains.

On January 29, the Henan Provincial Health and Health Commission informed that on January 28, 38 new cases were confirmed, 4 new cases were severe, 1 died, and 1 recovered. Among them, Liyang City reported the first confirmed case, with one confirmed case. Among the newly confirmed cases in other cities, 3 cases were confirmed in Zhengzhou, 1 in Kaifeng, 3 in Anyang, 3 in Hebi, 1 in Xinxiang, 1 in Sanmenxia, 5 in Nanyang, 7 in Shangqiu, and Zhoukou. 4 cases in Xinshi City, 3 cases in Xinyang City, 6 cases in Zhumadian City.

On January 30, the Henan Provincial Health and Health Commission informed that 72 new cases were confirmed on January 29, 4 new cases were severe, and 1 case recovered. Among the newly confirmed cases, 6 were in Zhengzhou, 1 in Kaifeng, 3 in Pingdingshan, 2 in Anyang, 1 in Hebi, 4 in Xinxiang, 1 in Xuchang, 2 in Luohe, and 1 in Sanmenxia. 20 cases in Nanyang City, 4 cases in Shangqiu City, 6 cases in Zhoukou City, 10 cases in Xinyang City, 9 cases in Zhumadian City, 1 case in Huaxian County, and 1 case in Changyuan City.

On January 31, the Henan Provincial Health and Health Commission reported that 74 new cases were confirmed on January 30, one was critically ill, and one recovered. Among the newly confirmed cases, 4 were in Zhengzhou, 2 in Kaifeng, 1 in Luoyang, 2 in Pingdingshan, 4 in Anyang, 4 in Xinxiang, 2 in Liyang, 5 in Xuchang, and 2 in Luohe. 1 case in Sanmenxia City, 10 cases in Nanyang City, 9 cases in Shangqiu City, 7 cases in Xinyang City, 11 cases in Zhoukou City, 5 cases in Zhumadian City, 1 case in Changyuan City, 4 cases in Yongcheng City.

=== February 2020 ===
On February 1, the Henan Provincial Health and Health Commission informed that 70 new cases were confirmed on January 31. Among the newly confirmed cases, 6 were in Zhengzhou, 2 in Kaifeng, 2 in Luoyang, 1 in Pingdingshan, 4 in Anyang, 6 in Xinxiang, 4 in Xuchang, 1 in Luohe, and 1 in Sanmenxia. 5 cases in Nanyang City, 2 cases in Shangqiu City, 21 cases in Xinyang City, 2 cases in Zhoukou City, 10 cases in Zhumadian City, 3 cases in Yongcheng City.

On February 2, the Henan Provincial Health and Health Commission informed that 71 new cases were confirmed and 1 new case was discharged on February 1. Among the newly confirmed cases, there were 9 cases in Zhengzhou, 3 in Kaifeng, 2 in Luoyang, 5 in Jiaozuo, 3 in Pingdingshan, 2 in Hebi, 1 in Xuchang, 2 in Luohe, and 9 in Nanyang. 7 cases in Shangqiu City, 18 cases in Xinyang City, 2 cases in Zhoukou City, 6 cases in Zhumadian City, 1 case in Yongcheng City, and 1 case in Dengzhou City.

On February 3, the Henan Provincial Health and Health Commission informed that there were 73 new confirmed cases and 10 new discharged cases on February 2. Among the newly confirmed cases, 7 were in Zhengzhou City, 5 in Pingdingshan City (including 1 in Ruzhou City), 4 in Anyang City, 4 in Xinxiang City, 1 in Jiaozuo City, 2 in Xuchang City, 4 in Luohe City, and Nanyang 8 cases (including 1 case in Dengzhou City), 6 cases in Shangqiu City (including 1 case in Yongcheng City), 11 cases in Xinyang City, 7 cases in Zhoukou City (including 1 case in Luyi County), 12 cases in Zhumadian City, Jiyuan Demonstration Area 2 cases.

On February 4, the Henan Provincial Health and Health Commission informed that 109 new cases were diagnosed and 6 new cases were discharged on February 3. Among the newly confirmed cases, 13 were in Zhengzhou, 1 in Kaifeng, 5 in Luoyang, 9 in Pingdingshan, 4 in Anyang, 2 in Hebi, and 6 in Xinxiang (including 1 in Changyuan), and Jiaozuo There were 4 cases in Liyang City, 1 case in Liyang City, 4 cases in Xuchang City, 3 cases in Luohe City, 15 cases in Nanyang City, 10 cases in Shangqiu City, 13 cases in Xinyang City (including 2 cases in Gushi County), 5 cases in Zhoukou City, and 14 in Zhumadian City. Cases (including 2 cases in Xincai County).

On February 5, the Henan Provincial Health and Health Commission informed that 89 new cases were diagnosed and 21 new cases were discharged in 00:00–24:00 on February 4. Among the newly confirmed cases, 7 were in Zhengzhou, 5 in Kaifeng, 5 in Luoyang, 6 in Pingdingshan, 2 in Anyang, 6 in Xinxiang, 3 in Jiaozuo, 5 in Xuchang, and 1 in Luohe. 8 cases in Nanyang City, 1 case in Shangqiu City, 26 cases in Xinyang City (including 1 case in Gushi County), 4 cases in Zhoukou City (including 1 case in Luyi County), and 10 cases in Zhumadian City.

On February 6, the Henan Provincial Health and Health Commission informed that 87 new cases were confirmed and 13 new cases were discharged in 00:00–24:00 on February 5. Among the newly confirmed cases, 10 were in Zhengzhou City, 1 in Kaifeng City, 4 in Luoyang City, 7 in Pingdingshan City, 2 in Anyang City, 2 in Xinxiang City (including 1 in Changyuan City), 2 in Jiaozuo City, and Liyang City. There were 1 case in Shanghai, 2 cases in Xuchang City, 2 cases in Luohe City, 4 cases in Nanyang City, 4 cases in Shangqiu City, 26 cases in Xinyang City (including 2 cases in Gushi County), 3 cases in Zhoukou City, and 16 cases in Zhumadian City (including Xincai County 1 case), Jiyuan demonstration area 1 case.

On February 7, the Henan Provincial Health and Health Commission informed that in 00:00–24:00 on February 6, Henan Province had newly confirmed 63 cases of pneumonia infected with novel coronavirus infection, 14 newly discharged cases, and 1 new death. Among the newly confirmed cases, 10 were in Zhengzhou City, 2 in Kaifeng City (including 1 in Lankao County), 3 in Luoyang City, 5 in Pingdingshan City, 3 in Anyang City, 1 in Hebi City, 1 in Jiaozuo City, and Xuchang City. 2 cases, 7 cases in Nanyang City (including 1 case in Dengzhou City), 7 cases in Shangqiu City (including 1 case in Yongcheng City), 12 cases in Xinyang City (including 3 cases in Gushi County), 1 case in Zhoukou City, and 8 cases in Zhumadian City (Including 1 case in Xincai County), 1 case in Jiyuan Demonstration Area.

On February 8, the Henan Provincial Health and Health Commission informed that in 00:00–24:00 on February 7, Henan Province had newly confirmed 67 cases of pneumonia infected with novel coronavirus infection, 29 new discharged cases, and 1 new death. Among the newly confirmed cases, 16 cases were in Xinyang City (including 1 case in Gushi County), 10 cases were in Nanyang City (including 1 case in Dengzhou City), 8 cases were in Zhengzhou City, 7 cases were in Zhumadian City (including 1 case in Xincai County), 4 cases in Shangqiu City (including 3 cases in Yongcheng City), 3 cases in Luohe City, 3 cases in Anyang City (including 1 case in Hua County), 2 cases in Pingdingshan City, 2 cases in Hebi City, 2 cases in Jiaozuo City, 2 cases in Xuchang City, and Zhoukou City 2 cases in Shenyang City, 2 cases in Liyang City, 2 cases in Xinxiang City, 1 case in Kaifeng City, and 1 case in Luoyang City.

On February 9, the Henan Provincial Health and Health Commission informed that in 00:00–24:00 February 8, Henan Province had newly confirmed 53 cases of novel coronavirus pneumonia, 34 newly discharged cases, and 2 new deaths. Among the newly confirmed cases, 13 cases were in Xinyang City, 7 cases in Shangqiu City (including 2 in Yongcheng City), 6 cases in Zhengzhou City, 5 cases in Nanyang City, 4 cases in Hebi City, 4 cases in Jiaozuo City, 3 cases in Kaifeng City, and Zhumadian City. 3 cases, 2 cases in Pingdingshan City, 2 cases in Liyang City, 1 case in Anyang City, 1 case in Xuchang City, 1 case in Luohe City, and 1 case in Xinxiang City (including 1 case in Changyuan City).

On February 10, the Henan Provincial Health and Health Commission informed that in 00:00–24:00 on February 9, there were 40 new confirmed cases of novel coronavirus pneumonia in Henan Province and 38 new discharged cases. Among the newly confirmed cases, 15 cases were in Xinyang (including 5 in Gushi County), 7 in Zhumadian, 4 in Zhengzhou, 3 in Zhoukou, 2 in Pingdingshan, 2 in Luoyang, and 2 in Xinxiang (including 1 in Changyuan City), 1 in Liyang City, 1 in Anyang City, 1 in Shangqiu City, 1 in Nanyang City, and 1 in Jiaozuo City.

On February 11, the Henan Provincial Health and Health Commission notified that in 00:00–24:00 on February 10, Henan had 32 new confirmed cases of novel coronavirus pneumonia, 29 new discharges, and 1 new death. Among the newly confirmed cases, 8 cases were in Xinyang City (including 4 cases in Gushi County), 3 in Zhumadian City, 3 in Shangqiu City, 3 in Jiaozuo City, 2 in Nanyang City, 2 in Zhengzhou City, 2 in Pingdingshan City, and Xinxiang. 2 cases (including 1 in Changyuan City), 1 in Anyang City, 1 in Xuchang City, 1 in Luohe City, 1 in Luoyang City, 1 in Kaifeng City, 1 in Hebi City, and 1 in Liyang City.

On February 12, the Henan Provincial Health and Health Commission informed that in 00:00–24:00 on February 11, 30 new cases of coronavirus pneumonia were newly confirmed in Henan, 33 were discharged, and 1 was dead. Among the newly confirmed cases, there were 5 cases in Zhengzhou City (including 1 in Gongyi City), 5 cases in Xinxiang City (including 5 in Changyuan City), 3 cases in Anyang City, 3 cases in Xinyang City (including 2 cases in Gushi County), and Zhumadian. 2 cases in Shanghai, 2 cases in Nanyang, 2 cases in Luohe, 2 cases in Puyang, 2 cases in Xuchang, 1 case in Pingdingshan, 1 case in Luoyang, 1 case in Hebi, and 1 case in Zhoukou.

On February 13, the Henan Provincial Health and Health Commission informed that in 00:00–24:00 on February 12, there were 34 new confirmed cases of novel coronavirus pneumonia in Henan, 27 new discharges, and 2 new deaths. Among the newly confirmed cases, 9 cases were in Xinyang City (including 1 case in Gushi County), 7 cases in Nanyang City, 6 cases in Zhumadian City, 4 cases in Zhengzhou City, 2 cases in Zhoukou City (including 1 case in Luyi County), and 1 in Luoyang City. Cases, 1 case in Pingdingshan City, 1 case in Anyang City, 1 case in Xinxiang City, 1 case in Jiaozuo City, and 1 case in Shangqiu City.

On February 14, the Henan Provincial Health and Health Commission informed that in 00:00–24:00 on February 13, Henan Province had newly confirmed 15 cases of novel coronavirus pneumonia, 55 newly discharged cases, and 1 new death. Among the newly confirmed cases, 3 were in Xinyang, 3 in Zhumadian, 3 in Xuchang, 1 in Nanyang, 1 in Zhengzhou, 1 in Zhoukou, 1 in Pingdingshan, 1 in Xinxiang, and 1 in Shangqiu.

=== March 2020 ===
On March 11, Zhengzhou confirmed an imported case. As the patient deliberately concealed his travel history abroad at the beginning of March, he has been under investigation by Zhengzhou City Public Security Bureau University Road Branch. On March 28, one new local confirmed case was added in Luohe City. The patient was a 56-year-old female.

=== April 2020 ===
On April 13, the last confirmed patient in Henan Province was discharged from the hospital. So far, there have been no hospitalized cases in Henan Province.

=== September 2020 ===
On September 12, 1 newly imported confirmed case in Henan Province. One more case was added on September 16 On September 19, Henan Province added 1 newly imported confirmed case On September 22, Henan Province added 1 newly imported confirmed case. On September 29, 1 new confirmed case in Henan Province (an asymptomatic infection imported from abroad on the 28th was converted into a confirmed case)

=== October 2020 ===
On October 20, 2 new confirmed cases of new coronary pneumonia in Henan Province (both imported from abroad) On October 27, 1 new confirmed case of new coronary pneumonia in Henan Province (imported from abroad)

=== November 2020 ===
On November 4, 2 new confirmed cases of new coronary pneumonia in Henan Province (imported from abroad) On November 12, 1 new confirmed case of new coronary pneumonia in Henan Province (imported from abroad) On November 14, 1 new confirmed case of new coronary pneumonia in Henan Province (transferred from an imported asymptomatic infection) On November 23, 1 new confirmed case of new coronary pneumonia in Henan Province (referred to as a confirmed case of asymptomatic infection imported from abroad)
