= COVID-19 pandemic in Inner Mongolia =

Ongoing COVID-19 viral pandemic in Inner Mongolia, China

- Disease: COVID-19
- Pathogen: SARS-CoV-2
- Source: Wuhan, China
- Location: Mongolia

This article documents the situation of the COVID-19 pandemic in Inner Mongolia, the People's Republic of China.

== Timeline ==
=== January ===
On January 23, Manzhouli City, Inner Mongolia Autonomous Region discovered a confirmed case of the new coronavirus pneumonia. The patient, male, 30 years old, lives in Wuhan and is engaged in the clothing business. After traveling to Manzhouli on the 21st, he went directly to the emergency department of Manzhouli People's Hospital. At present, the patient has received isolation treatment in a designated hospital, and his condition is stable. At present, 20 close contacts have been tracked and are undergoing medical observation.

On January 25, the Inner Mongolia Health and Welfare Commission reported a new confirmed case of novel coronavirus pneumonia in the Xilingol League.

On January 26, the Inner Mongolia Health and Health Commission reported 5 newly confirmed cases of novel coronavirus pneumonia.

On January 27, the Inner Mongolia Health and Welfare Commission reported 4 newly confirmed cases of novel coronavirus pneumonia, including 2 cases in Baotou City, 1 case in Hinggan League, and 1 case in Tongliao City, all of which were the first confirmed cases in the three cities.

On January 28, the Inner Mongolia Health and Welfare Commission reported 2 newly confirmed cases of novel coronavirus pneumonia, including 1 case in Baotou City and 1 case in Chifeng City.

On January 29, the Inner Mongolia Health and Welfare Commission reported 3 new cases of novel coronavirus pneumonia, 1 new severe case, and 1 new critical case. Among the three newly confirmed cases, two in Hohhot City and one in Bayannur City were the first confirmed cases in the two cities; one new critical case in Hulunbuir City and one severe case in Xilingol League.

On January 30, the Inner Mongolia Autonomous Region reported two new confirmed cases of novel coronavirus pneumonia; two new severe cases, one new critical case, and one new suspected case. Among the two newly diagnosed cases, one was in Dalad Banner, Ordos City, and one was in Wuyuan County, Bayannur City.

On January 31, the Inner Mongolia Autonomous Region reported 2 new confirmed cases of novel coronavirus pneumonia; among the confirmed cases, there was 1 new severe case. The 2 newly confirmed cases were 1 case in Dorbod Banner in Ulan Qab City and 1 case in Huade County.

=== February ===
On February 1, the Inner Mongolia Autonomous Region reported 3 new confirmed cases of novel coronavirus pneumonia, 1 new discharge case, 1 new severe case, and 1 severe case turned into a normal case. Three newly diagnosed cases were 2 in Dalad Banner, Ordos City, and 1 in Linhe District, Bayannur City. The newly discharged case was a confirmed case surnamed Le, in Manzhouli City, Hulunbuir City, who recovered and was discharged on the 31st. The newly added severe case was 1 case in Wuyuan County in Bayannur, and 1 severe case changed into a normal case in Erenhot City.

On February 2, the Inner Mongolia Autonomous Region reported 4 new confirmed cases of pneumonia infected with new coronavirus.

On February 3, 7 newly confirmed cases were added.

On February 3, 1 newly confirmed cases were added.

On February 3, 7 newly confirmed cases were added.

On February 6, 4 newly diagnosed cases and 1 new discharge were added.

On February 7, 4 newly diagnosed cases were added, and another 1 was discharged.

On February 8, 2 newly diagnosed cases were added, including: 1 case of Tumd Right Banner in Baotou City and 1 case in Holingol City of Tongliao City. One new case was discharged.

On February 9, 2 newly confirmed cases were added. The newly confirmed cases were Mr. Zhao and Ms. Wu in Wulatezhongqi, Bayannur city. They are married and live in Tianjin. Zhao worked in an enterprise in Wuhan, and his wife, Wu, lived in Tianjin, and became ill when he returned to Urad Middle Banner for the Chinese New Year. On February 8, the couple was diagnosed with novel coronavirus pneumonia by nucleic acid detection in the laboratory of Bayannur CDC. Epidemiological investigations are still ongoing

On February 10, 4 newly diagnosed cases were added, including 3 cases in Holingol City, Tongliao City, and 1 case in Donghe District, Baotou City. As of 10:00 on February 10, the Inner Mongolia Autonomous Region has reported a total of 58 confirmed cases of novel coronavirus pneumonia, of which 11 are in Ordos City (9 in Dalad Banner, 1 in Dongsheng District has recovered and been discharged, and 1 in Otog Front Banner has recovered and been discharged), 11 cases in Baotou City (7 cases in Tumd Right Banner, 3 cases in Hondlon District, 1 case in Donghe District), 7 cases in Hohhot City (3 cases in Yuquan District, 2 cases in Xincheng District, 1 case in Saihan District), 1 case in Huimin District), 6 cases in Bayannur City (2 cases in Wuyuan County, 2 cases in Linhe District, 2 cases in Wulatezhongqi), 6 cases in Tongliao City (5 cases in Holingol City, 1 in Economic Development Zone) Cases), 5 cases in Hulun Buir City (3 cases in Molidawa Banner, 1 case in Manzhouli City has recovered and been discharged, 1 case in Yakeshi City), 4 cases in Chifeng City (2 cases in Yuanbao Mountain District, 1 case in Songshan District has recovered and been discharged, 1 case in Linxi County), 3 cases in Ulanqab City (2 cases in Huade County, 1 case in Dorbod Banner), 2 cases in Haibowan District, Wuhai City, 2 cases in Xilingol League (1 case in Xilinhot City, 1 case in Erenhot City) Has recovered and been discharged), Hinggan League Ulanhot City 1 case.

=== March ===
As of 7:00 on March 1, from 7:00 on February 29 to 7:00 on March 1, there were no new confirmed cases of novel coronavirus pneumonia, no new suspected cases, 5 new confirmed cases discharged, and 6 new suspected cases discharged from the hospital; a total of 75 confirmed cases of novel coronavirus pneumonia were reported, of which there were 24 active confirmed cases, 51 discharged cases, 2 severe cases, 3 critical cases, and 4 suspected cases. The active confirmed cases : 6 cases in Xilingol League (2 cases in Xilinhot City, 4 cases in Duolun County), 5 cases in Baotou City (4 cases in Tumoyou Right Banner, 1 case in Hondlon District), 4 cases in Holingol City in Tongliao City, 3 cases in Hohhot City (2 cases in Yuquan District, 1 case in Saihan District), 2 cases in Morin Dawa Banner in Hulunbuir City, 1 case in Linhe District in Bayannur City, 1 case in Dalad Banner in Ordos City, One case was in Huade County, Ulanqab City, and one case was in Ongniud Banner, Chifeng City. There were 160 close contacts who were still undergoing medical observation, and 5 persons were released from medical observation on the same day.

As of 7:00 on March 4, the Inner Mongolia Autonomous Region has reported a total of 75 confirmed cases of novel coronavirus pneumonia, 59 confirmed cases recovered and were discharged, and 1 died.

On March 19, the last confirmed patient in Baotou City, Inner Mongolia was discharged. So far, there are no locally confirmed cases in Inner Mongolia.

On March 25, the Inner Mongolia Autonomous Region reported two new imported diagnosed cases of imported novel coronavirus pneumonia. The two diagnosed patients all took Air China CA856 flight, diverted from Capital International Airport to Hohhot Baita International Airport, and arrived in Hohhot on March 23. Investigations were conducted in accordance with the relevant requirements for the prevention and control of novel coronavirus pneumonia of entrants. Experts of the autonomous region, and Hohhot consulted and diagnosed them as confirmed cases of novel coronavirus pneumonia.

=== April ===
From 7:00 on April 6 to 7:00 on April 8, Inner Mongolia reported 6 new confirmed cases of imported novel coronavirus pneumonia, of which 5 confirmed cases were all from Moscow, Russia. On April 8, the Manzhouli Highway Port was closed.

Autonomous Region reported 27 newly diagnosed cases of imported novel coronavirus pneumonia.

From 16:00 on April 12 to 7:00 on April 13, the Inner Mongolia Autonomous Region reported a confirmed case of imported novel coronavirus pneumonia.
