= COVID-19 pandemic in Tibet =

Details of ongoing viral pandemic in the Tibet Autonomous Region

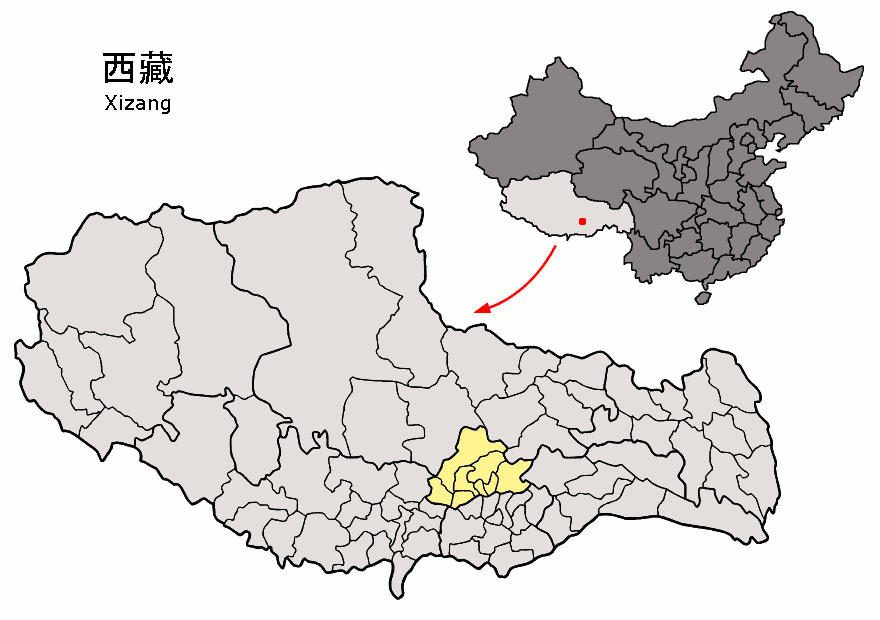
- Yellow: District with one or more cases
- Disease: COVID-19
- Pathogen: SARS-CoV-2
- Location: Tibet
- Arrival date: 30 January 2020

This article documents the COVID-19 pandemic in the Tibet Autonomous Region.

== Background ==
On 12 January 2020, the World Health Organization (WHO) confirmed that a novel coronavirus was the cause of a respiratory illness in a cluster of people in Wuhan City, Hubei Province, China, which was reported to the WHO on 31 December 2019.

The case fatality ratio for COVID-19 was much lower than that for SARS of 2003, but the transmission rate was significantly higher, with a significant total death toll.

== Timeline ==
Although there were no suspected and confirmed cases in Tibet at the time, an Autonomous Region leadership group was established on January 27, 2020, with the Secretary of the Party Committee of the Tibet Autonomous Region and the chairman of the Autonomous Region as the group leaders, to respond to the novel coronavirus pneumonia. At the same time, Tibet declared a Level II major public health emergency response. Starting on the same day, all tourist sites in Tibet were temporarily closed, and all persons entering Tibet were required to be quarantined for 14 days in designated places. On 29 January, 2020, Tibet escalated its major public health emergency response level to Level I.

On 29 January, Tibet reported its first suspected cases, a person from Suizhou, Hubei, who took a train from Wuchang railway station to Lhasa on 22–24 January. On 30 January, the case was confirmed. On 12 February, the patient was discharged after recovery from the Third People's Hospital of Tibet Autonomous Region. Thus, the number of active confirmed and suspected cases in Tibet decreased to zero.

Tibet had not found any further cases of COVID-19 for over two and a half years until August 7, 2022, when four travelers from Tingri County were diagnosed with COVID-19, although they were all asymptomatic. The travelers were between 47 and 61 years old. It was later reported that the total number of cases for August 7 was 22 (including one case with symptoms), many of whom entered Tibet's capital Lhasa from Shigatse. The discovery of these cases ended China's longest COVID-free streak among regions and provinces after 920 days.

In response to the new COVID-19 cases and in line with mainland China's Zero-COVID policy, the city of Shigatse imposed a three-day lockdown on August 8, during which only essential businesses are allowed to operate and all travel (inbound or outbound) is prohibited. Several buildings were also locked down in Lhasa.

On 7 December 2022, the Zero-COVID policy was lifted following widespread protests in mainland China, leading to a surge of COVID infection. More than 100 people in Lhasa had died by early January 2023. On 14 January, China's National Health Commission reported that almost 60,000 deaths had occurred since the policy was lifted, which did not include ethnic minority regions like Tibet. The International Campaign for Tibet noted that it was difficult to determine the exact death toll because of this, but early in the pandemic estimated that close to 693,000 Tibetans age 60 and over could die from COVID-19. Sources inside Tibet told the ICT that the vast majority of people in Lhasa were infected and that sky burial sites were overwhelmed with bodies.

There has not been traceable data provided to update these numbers post 2022.

== See also ==
- COVID-19 pandemic in Bhutan
- COVID-19 pandemic in mainland China
- COVID-19 pandemic in Nepal
