= COVID-19 pandemic in Liaoning =

Ongoing COVID-19 viral pandemic in Liaoning, China

- Disease: COVID-19
- Pathogen: SARS-CoV-2
- Location: Liaoning, China
- First outbreak: Wuhan, Hubei, China
- Index case: January 20, 2020 – present (6 years, 3 months and 4 weeks ago)
- Confirmed cases: 403
- Suspected cases^{‡}: 0
- Severe cases: 0
- Recovered: 397
- Deaths: 2

This article documents the situation of the COVID-19 pandemic in Liaoning Province, People's Republic of China.

== Timeline ==
=== January ===
On 21 January 2020, the first suspected case appeared in Dalian, Liaoning. The patient had been to Wuhan before symptoms appeared.

On 22 January, 2 confirmed cases were reported. They were respectively males aged 33 and 40, working in Wuhan and Xiantao, Hubei, having visited a doctor after returning to Dalian and Fushun, and were confirmed on 22 January; one of the cases was severe. They had both stayed in Wuhan, of which the latter had briefly stayed in Fushun and received isolated treatments in Shenyang.。

On 23 January, 1 new case was reported. As of 11:00 on 23 January, Liaoning Province had reported a total of 3 confirmed cases of pneumonia caused by novel coronavirus infection. At present, all three patients were isolated and treated in designated hospitals, and their conditions were stable. All their close contacts were subjected to medical observation.

On 24 January, 1 new case was reported, totalling to 4 cases. The male patient was a 42-year-old from Lingyuan City, Chaoyang. He took an EMU train from Wuhan to Beijing West on January 18, and then drove to Lingyuan City by himself. At present, the patient is a severe case with stable vital signs. 38 of its close contacts are under medical observation.

On January 25, 8 new cases were reported, with a total of 12 cases. 9 were severe cases.

During the day on January 25, 3 new cases were reported (all severe cases). In the evening, one new case was reported, which was confirmed in Dalian.

At 0 hours on January 26, 1 new case was reported, a confirmed case in Yingkou City; 2 new cases were reported at 9 am, both of which were the first cases in Dandong City and Panjin City; 2 new cases were reported at 4:30 pm, Cases in Benxi and Shenyang. As of 15:00 on January 26, 2020, Liaoning Province has reported a total of 21 confirmed cases of pneumonia with new coronavirus infection and 12 severe cases. Among the confirmed cases, 6 were in Shenyang, 4 in Dalian, 2 in Benxi, 1 in Dandong, 1 in Yingkou, 2 in Tieling, 2 in Chaoyang, 1 in Panjin, and 2 in Huludao. From the same day, the bus service in Benxi was temporarily suspended.

At 0 hours on January 27, Liaoning Province reported 1 new case, which was an imported mild case in Panjin City; at 10 a.m., a new case was reported, which was an imported severe case in Shenyang City; at 12:00 noon, a new case was reported, which was a confirmed case of Dalian City, a family member of an imported case in Wuhan, and a severe case; 3 new cases were notified at 6 pm, all of which were imported mild cases in Dandong City.

On January 28, Liaoning Province notified 3 new imported confirmed cases of pneumonia by novel coronavirus infection, including 1 case in Shenyang City, 1 case in Dandong City, and 1 case in Liaoyang City, all of which are common cases and the first case in Liaoyang City. Starting from the same day, Shenyang citizens must wear masks when taking the subway, otherwise they are prohibited from riding.

On January 29, Liaoning Province notified 9 new imported confirmed cases of pneumonia by novel coronavirus infection, including 4 cases in Jinzhou City, 2 cases in Chaoyang City, 2 cases in Huludao City, 2 cases in Shenyang City, all of which were common cases. Jinzhou City reported its first cases. The confirmed cases in Shenyang City are close contacts of the existing confirmed cases.

On January 30, Liaoning Province notified 2 new imported confirmed cases of pneumonia by new coronavirus infection, including 1 case in Benxi City, which was a severe case; 1 case in Panjin City, which was a common case.

On January 31, Liaoning Province notified 19 new confirmed cases of pneumonia by novel coronavirus infection, including 3 in Shenyang, 3 in Dalian, 2 in Chaoyang, 3 in Jinzhou, 1 in Tieling, and 4 in Panjin Cases, 1 case in Anshan City, 1 case in Fuxin City, 1 case in Huludao City, all of which were common cases.

=== February ===
On February 1, Liaoning Province notified 3 new confirmed cases of pneumonia by novel coronavirus infection, including 2 in Dalian and 1 in Fuxin. In the evening of the same day, 1 new imported confirmed case of pneumonia by novel coronavirus infection was reported in Dandong City, which was a common case.

On February 2, Liaoning Province notified 6 new confirmed cases of pneumonia by novel coronavirus infection, including 1 in Shenyang City, 2 in Dalian City, 1 in Fuxin City, 1 in Liaoyang City, 1 in Panjin City, all of which were common cases.

On February 3, Liaoning Province notified 4 new confirmed cases of pneumonia by novel coronavirus infection, including 2 cases in Shenyang City and 2 cases in Fuxin City.

On February 4, Liaoning Province notified 3 new confirmed cases of pneumonia by novel coronavirus infection, including 1 in Dalian City and 2 in Fuxin City, all of which are common cases. On the same day, the second confirmed case of pneumonia by novel coronavirus infection in Liaoning Province recovered and was discharged. In the evening of the same day, Liaoning Province reported 4 new confirmed cases of pneumonia by novel coronavirus infection, including 3 cases in Shenyang City and 1 case in Huludao City.

On February 5, Liaoning Province notified 8 new confirmed cases of pneumonia by novel coronavirus infection, including 5 cases in Shenyang City, 1 case in Dalian City, 1 case in Dandong City, and 1 case in Huludao City. Among the 7 new cases, there are 2 mild cases and 6 common cases. There were 2 new discharged cases, including 1 in Shenyang and 1 in Dalian.

On February 6, Liaoning Province notified 5 new confirmed cases of pneumonia by novel coronavirus infection, including 2 cases in Anshan City and 3 cases in Panjin City. 1 was a severe case, and 4 were common cases. One case in Dandong City was discharged.

On February 7, Liaoning Province notified 5 new confirmed cases of pneumonia caused by new coronavirus infection, including 2 cases in Shenyang City, 1 case in Jinzhou City, 2 cases in Huludao City; 1 was a severe case, 3 were common cases, 1 was a mild case. 1 case in Jinzhou City and 1 case in Shenyang City were discharged.

On February 8, Liaoning Province notified 6 new confirmed cases of pneumonia by novel coronavirus infection, including 2 cases in Dalian City, 1 case is common type, 1 case is severe case; One case in Jinzhou City is a common type case, one case in Shenyang City and one case in Jinzhou City are all common type cases. 1 case was discharged in Shenyang.

On February 9, Liaoning Province notified 2 new confirmed cases of pneumonia by novel coronavirus infection, including 1 imported case in Tieling City and 1 case in Jinzhou City, all of which are common cases. 4 newly discharged cases, including 2 in Shenyang City and 2 in Dandong City.

On February 10, Liaoning Province notified 1 new confirmed case of new coronavirus pneumonia, which was a common case. A total of 108 confirmed cases of new coronavirus pneumonia were reported, and 12 cases had recovered and been discharged. Of the 108 confirmed cases, 26 in Shenyang, 16 in Dalian, 3 in Anshan, 3 in Benxi, 7 in Dandong, 11 in Jinzhou, 1 in Yingkou, 8 in Fuxin, and 3 in Liaoyang, 4 cases in Tieling City, 6 cases in Chaoyang City, 11 cases in Panjin City, 9 cases in Huludao City. All 96 patients under treatment were isolated and treated in designated medical institutions, including 12 severe cases and 2 critical cases. Among 96 patients under treatment, 65 cases were imported cases and 31 cases were local infection cases.

From 9:00 on February 22, the emergency response level for the prevention and control of the new coronary pneumonia epidemic in Liaoning was adjusted from Level 1 emergency response to provincial Level 3 emergency response.

=== March ===
On March 19, the investigation of Liaoning Province revealed the first confirmed case imported from abroad, which was a common case, a student returning to Liaoning from the UK. The patient was studying in the UK, taking flight KE908 from London, England on March 14, transferring at Seoul Airport, South Korea, and arriving at Shenyang Taoxian Airport by flight KE831 on March 16. After entering the customs, the patient was immediately quarantined. Clinical symptoms appeared during the isolation observation period. Expert group evaluation confirmed this as a confirmed case. The patient was transferred to the Shenyang Center of Provincial Centralized Treatment Centers for treatment。

On March 22, Liaoning Province saw its second confirmed case imported from abroad, a 47-year-old Tieling woman. The patient took flight CA908 from Barajas Airport to Beijing on March 20 and arrived at Beijing Capital Airport at 5 am on March 21, Her temperature measurement at the customs showed no fever, and she waited for a return flight to Shenyang in the public area after exiting the customs. At 20 hours on March 21, she took flight CA1601 from Beijing Capital Airport and arrived at Shenyang Taoxian Airport at 21:30. Her temperature measurement showed no fever. She then took the designated car by Tieling County to leave Taoxian Airport and arrived at a Hanting Hotel as a Tieling County Centralized Isolation Point for centralized isolation observation. At 19 hours on March 22, the nucleic acid test of the city's CDC laboratory returned positive. She was transferred by the city's central hospital's negative pressure ambulance to Tieling's infectious disease hospital for isolation and treatment. At 23 hours, a provincial expert group evaluation confirmed her as a confirmed case of imported new coronavirus pneumonia, which was a common case.

On March 26, Dalian City confirmed the first imported case abroad. The patient as a 15-year-old student studying in the United States, who took Japan Airlines JL827 flight from Tokyo Narita Airport at 9:50 on March 25, Tokyo time and arrived at Dalian Zhoushuizi International Airport at 11:30. At 22:00 on the same day, the patient Cheng's nasopharyngeal swab nucleic acid by Dalian Customs returned positive. On the 26th, this was confirmed as a confirmed case (mild type) by the evaluation of the provincial expert group.

=== April ===
On April 15, final-year high school classes were resumed in Liaoning.

On April 18, seven cities in Liaoning postponed the start of their semester.

=== December ===
Another outbreak linked to a traveler from South Korea were reported in Shenyang late December. Health authorities identified 41 COVID-19 "medium-risk areas" in Shenyang and Dalian with dozens of cases confirmed.
