= COVID-19 pandemic in Xinjiang =

COVID-19 viral pandemic in Xinjiang, China

- Disease: COVID-19
- Pathogen: SARS-CoV-2
- Location: Xinjiang, China
- First outbreak: Wuhan, Hubei
- Index case: Ürümqi
- Arrival date: 23 January 2020 (6 years, 9 months, 3 weeks and 1 day ago)
- Confirmed cases: 902
- Active cases: 160
- Recovered: 739
- Deaths: 3

The COVID-19 epidemic in Xinjiang Uyghur Autonomous Region is part of the worldwide pandemic of coronavirus disease 2019 (COVID-19) caused by severe acute respiratory syndrome coronavirus 2 (SARS-CoV-2). On 23 January 2020, the local government confirmed the first two case in Urumchi, the capital city of Xinjiang.

== Timeline ==
=== January 2020 ===
On 23 January, Xinjiang Uyghur Autonomous Region Health Commission (XUARHC) confirmed 2 new imported confirmed cases of novel coronavirus pneumonia.

In 25–27 January, the XUARHC reported one new confirmed case for each day. On 27 January, 1 new severe case was reported. As of 26 January 24:00, Xinjiang had reported a total of 5 ccs of novel coronavirus pneumonia, of which 4 were in Ürümqi City and 1 in Ili Prefecture. The one severe case was in Ürümqi City.

On January 28, the XUARHC reported 5 new confirmed cases, of which Turpan City, the 7th Division, and Shihezi City of the 8th Division reported their first cases; among the other 2 new cases, 1 was in Ürümqi City, 1 in Ili Prefecture; there were 1 new severe case, which was in Yili Prefecture.

On January 29, the XUARHC reported 3 new confirmed cases and 2 new severe cases. Among the newly confirmed cases, 1 was in Ürümqi City and 2 were in Ili Prefecture; among the new severe cases, 2 were in Ürümqi City.

On January 30, the XUARHC reported 1 new confirmed case (Ürümqi City).

On January 31, the XUARHC reported 3 newly diagnosed cases, wherein the Aksu region reported its first confirmed case; of the other 2 newly increased confirmed cases, 1 was in Ürümqi City and 1 was in Ili Prefecture.

=== February 2020 ===
On 1 February, the XUARHC reported 1 newly confirmed case (the 9th Division of the Corps, first time reported), and 1 new severe case (Ili Prefecture)

On 2 February, the XUARHC reported 3 new diagnosed cases (all cases of the 9th Division of the Corps). On the same day, Ürümqi City metro announced the suspension of its service.

On 3 February, the XUARHC reported 3 new confirmed cases, 2 new severe cases, and 1 new critical case.

On 4 February, the XUARHC reported 5 new confirmed cases, and 2 new severe cases.

On 5 February, Xinjiang (including the Corps) reported 3 new confirmed cases of novel coronavirus pneumonia.

On 6 February, Xinjiang (including the Corps) reported 3 new confirmed cases of novel coronavirus pneumonia, wherein Bayingolin Mongol Autonomous Prefecture reported its first confirmed case; of the other new confirmed cases, 3 were in Ürümqi City.

On 7 February, Xinjiang (including the Corps) reported 3 new confirmed cases of novel coronavirus pneumonia, all in Ürümqi City.

On 8 February, Xinjiang (including the Corps) reported 3 new confirmed cases of novel coronavirus pneumonia, of which the 12th Division of the Corps reported its first confirmed case; among the newly confirmed cases in the other 2 cities, 1 was in Ürümqi City, and 1 in Bayingolin.

On 9 February, Xinjiang (including the Corps) reported 3 new confirmed cases of novel coronavirus pneumonia. Among the newly confirmed cases, 1 was in Ürümqi City, 1 was in Ili Prefecture, and 1 was in Bayingolin.

As of 24:00 on February 9, Xinjiang (including the Corps) had reported a total of 49 confirmed cases of novel coronavirus pneumonia (38 cases in Xinjiang Uyghur Autonomous Region, 11 cases in Xinjiang Production and Construction Corps), of which: of the confirmed cases, there were 20 cases in Ürümqi City, 10 cases in Ili Prefecture, 3 cases in Changji Prefecture, 1 case in Turpan City, 3 cases in Bayingolin, 1 case in Aksu Region, 3 cases in the 4th Division of the Corps, 1 case in the Wujiaqu City, the 6th Division of the Corps, 1 case in the 7th Division of the Corps, 1 case in Shihezi City, 8th Division, 4 cases in 9th Division, and 1 case in 12th Division; there were 12 active severe cases, and 4 critical cases.

On February 10, Xinjiang (including the Corps) reported 4 new diagnosed cases of novel coronavirus pneumonia, of which the 4th Division of the Corps reported its first 3 cases; among other newly diagnosed cases, 1 case was in Changji Prefecture.

=== March 2020 ===
As of 24:00 on March 1, Xinjiang (including the Corps) reported that there were no newly diagnosed cases of novel coronavirus pneumonia, no new deaths, and two new cases of cured discharge, both of which were in Ürümqi City; 76 cumulative confirmed cases of novel coronavirus pneumonia have been reported (52 cases in Xinjiang Uyghur Autonomous Region, 24 cases in Xinjiang Production and Construction Corps), a total of 3 deaths, and a total of 64 cases recovered and discharged; there were 9 active confirmed cases (7 cases in Xinjiang Uyghur Autonomous Region, 2 cases in Xinjiang Production and Construction Corps), Of which: 4 cases in Ürümqi City, 1 case in Changji Prefecture, 2 cases in Turpan City, 1 case in the 8th Division of the Corps, 1 case in the 9th Division of the Corps; there were 2 active severe cases; 3137 people were currently undergoing medical observation.

On March 8, the last confirmed case of new coronavirus pneumonia in Xinjiang met the discharge criteria per expert group evaluation. The patient recovered and was discharged. Thus, Xinjiang has now no hospitalised cases.

As of 30 March 2020, no reports of cases of COVID-19 in Xinjiang prisons or of conditions in the Xinjiang re-education camps had emerged. Anna Hayes, senior lecturer in politics and international relations of Australia's James Cook University, expressed concern about possible spread in the camps.

=== July 2020 ===
On 15 July, Xinjiang local government confirmed 1 case in Tengritagh District of Urumchi.

On 17 July, Xinjiang local government confirmed 16 cases in Urumchi, bringing the total new cases to 17.

On 18 July, Xinjiang local government confirmed 13 cases in Urumchi, bringing the total new cases to 30.

On 19 July, Xinjiang local government confirmed 17 cases in the region, 16 of them in Urumchi and one of them in Kashgar, bringing the total new cases to 47.

On 20 July, Xinjiang local government confirmed 8 new cases in Urumchi, bringing the total active cases to 55.

=== August 2020 ===
By 24 August, Xinjiang has confirmed 902 cases in total.

=== October 2020 ===
In October 2020, it was reported that an outbreak of more than 180 cases, China's largest outbreak in months, appeared to be occurring in a Xinjiang factory linked to "forced labour and the government's controversial policies towards Uighur residents".

== Government responses ==
On 15 July 2020, the government canceled almost all flights in and out of the capital city Ürümqi.

On 18 July, local authorities declared 'Wartime state' for Ürümqi, the government imposed strict measures on movement, and suspended all kinds of group activities.

== See also ==
- 2022 Ürümqi fire
