= COVID-19 pandemic in Heilongjiang =

Ongoing COVID-19 viral pandemic in Heilongjiang, China

- Disease: COVID-19
- Pathogen: SARS-CoV-2
- Location: Heilongjiang
- Index case: 21 January 2020 (6 years, 3 months, 3 weeks and 6 days ago)
- Confirmed cases: 936
- Active cases: 369
- Recovered: 556
- Deaths: 13

This article documents the situation of the COVID-19 pandemic in the province of Heilongjiang, China. The first confirmed COVID-19 case in the province occurred in Mudanjiang on 21 January 2020, and though confirmed COVID-19 cases had begun to plateau by early March, by late March, international arrivals, largely from the neighboring Russian Far East, had added hundreds of cases to the province's total, leading to measures such as closed community management (封闭管理) in Suifenhe on 8 April.

== Statistics ==
COVID-19 pandemic medical cases in Heilongjiang by prefecture-level division
Prefecture-level division	Cases (Note: Only including confirmed symptomatic cases. Actual case numbers may be higher.)	Deaths	Recov.	Ref.
13 / 13	5,869	13	2,472	Ref.
Imported	386	0	116	
Harbin	2,645	4	869	
Shuangyashan	52	3	49	
Suihua	671	4	535	
Jixi	52	0	52	
Qiqihar	45	1	44	
Daqing	37	1	36	
Mudanjiang	187	0	77	
Qitaihe	18	0	18	
Jiamusi	56	0	55	
Heihe	297	0	296	
Hegang	10	0	5	
Daxing'anling	10	0	3	
Yichun	1	0	1	
Updated 3 December 2022
