= COVID-19 pandemic in the Republic of Ireland =

COVID-19 pandemic in Ireland
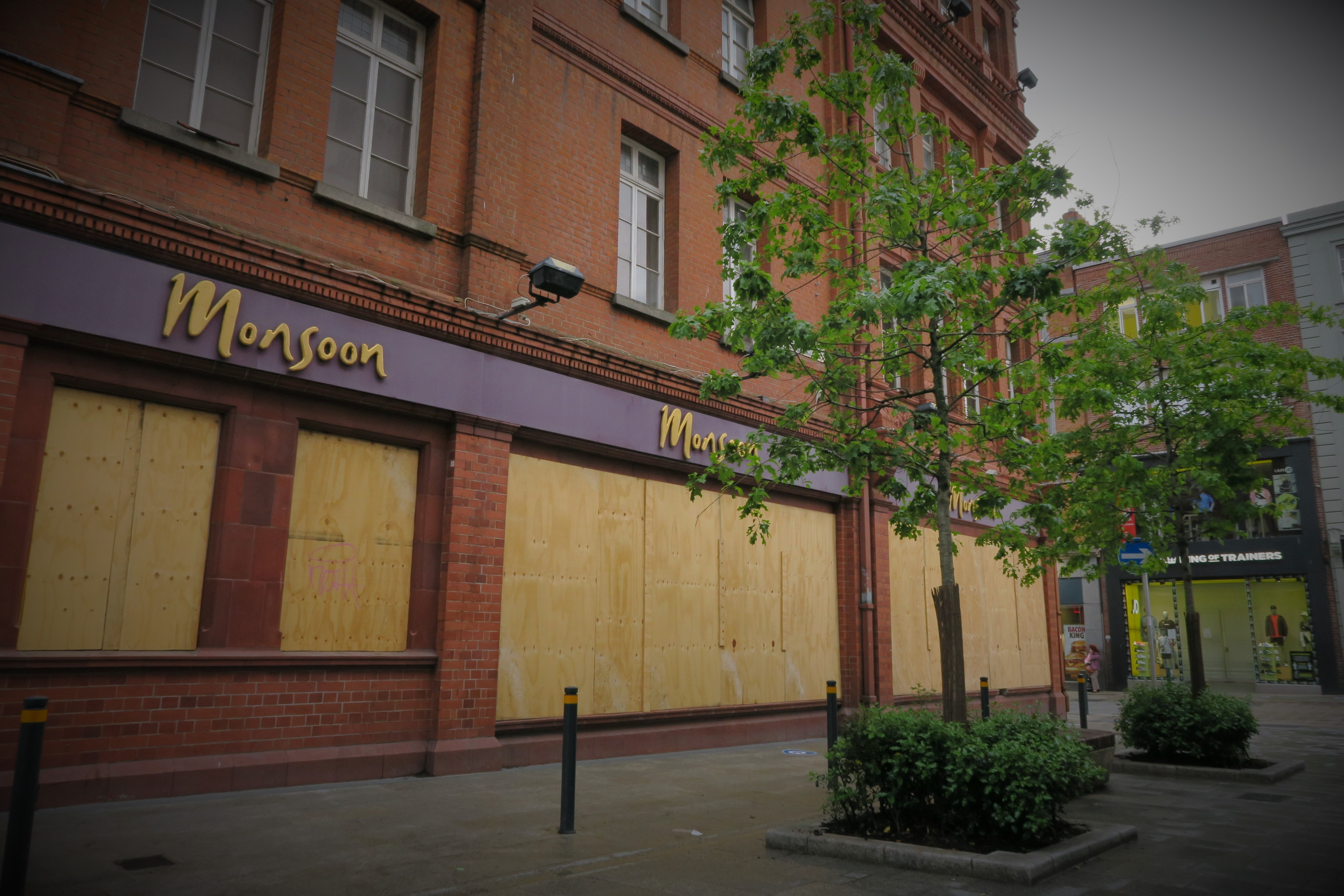
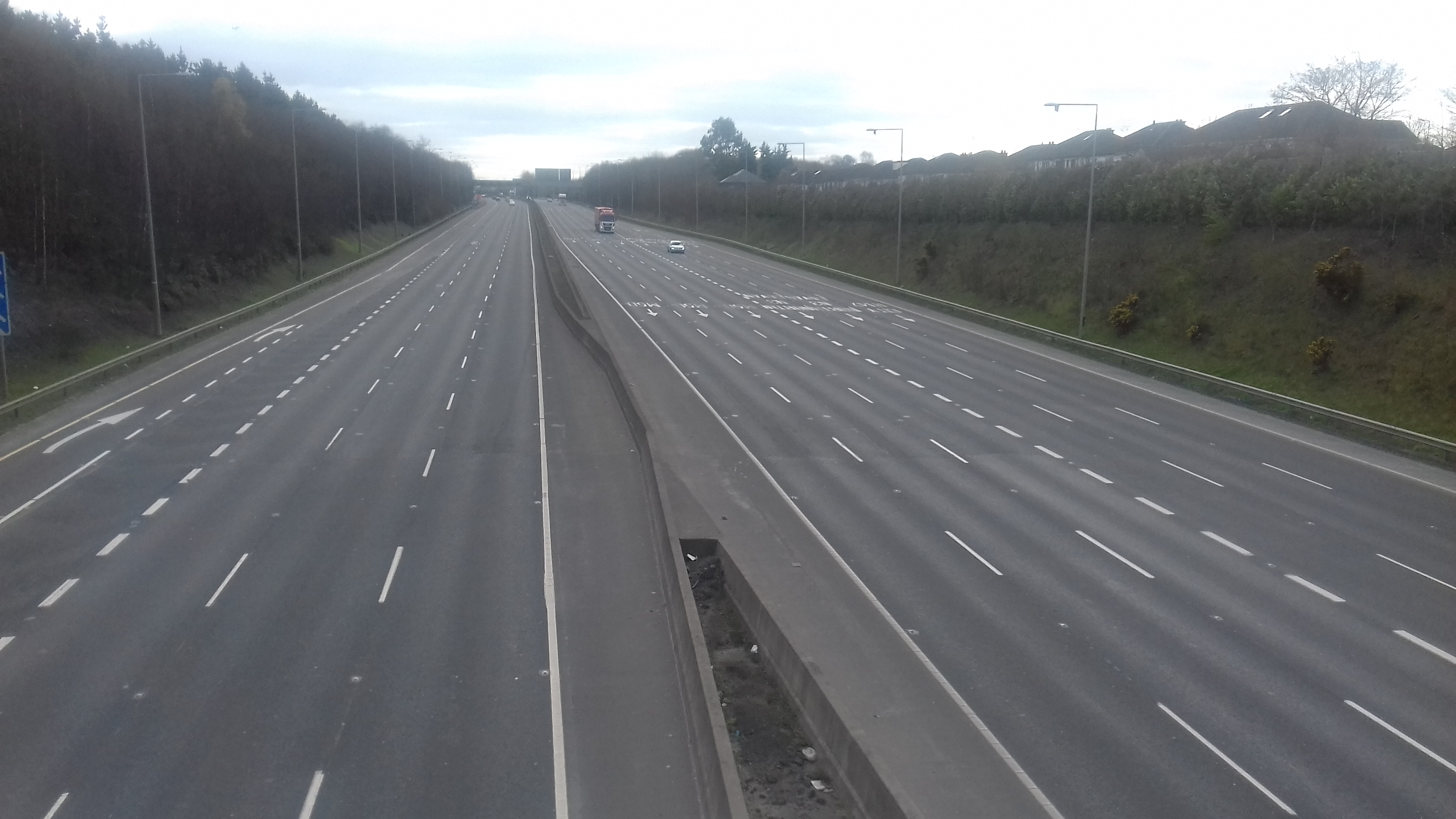
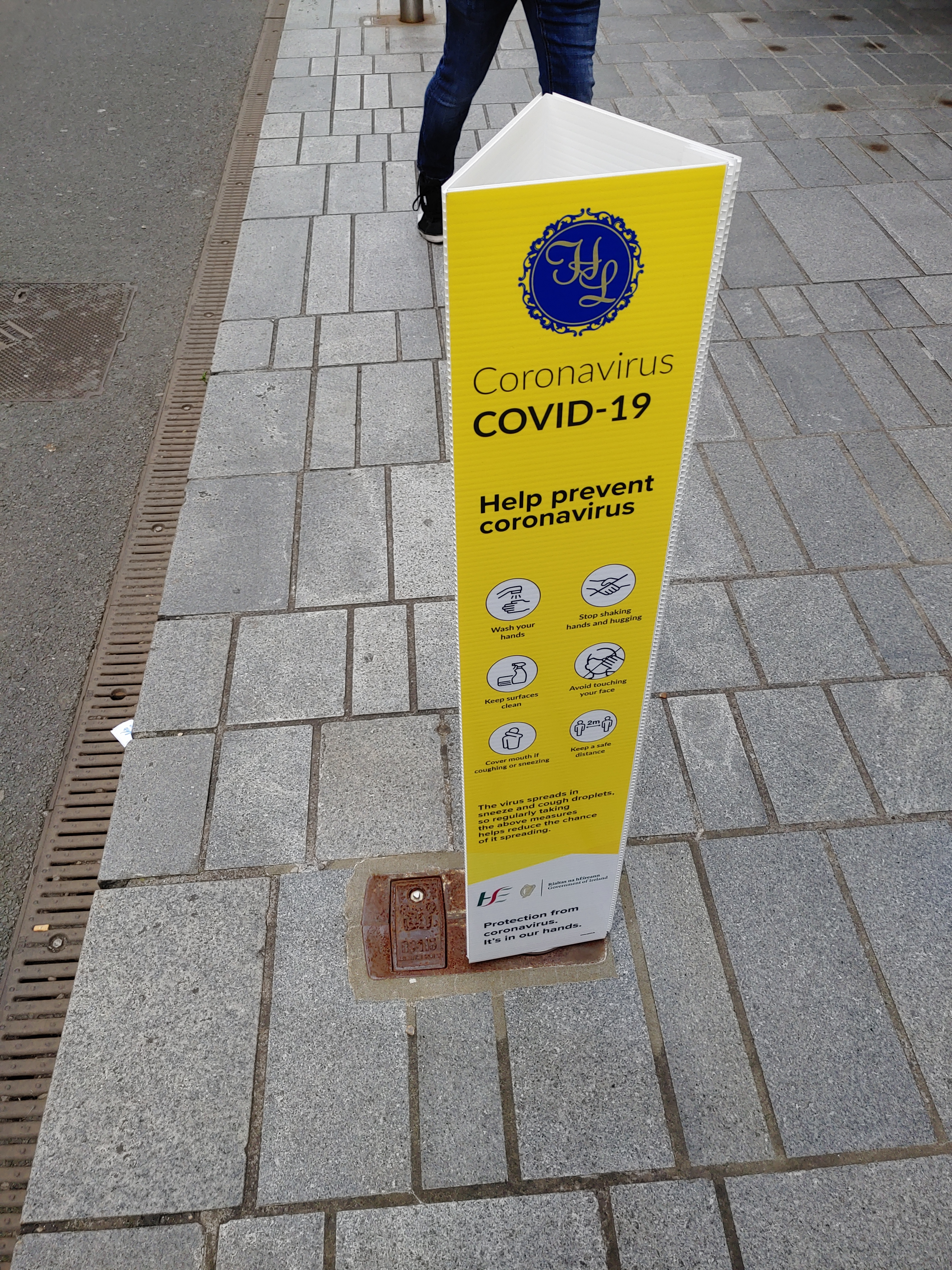
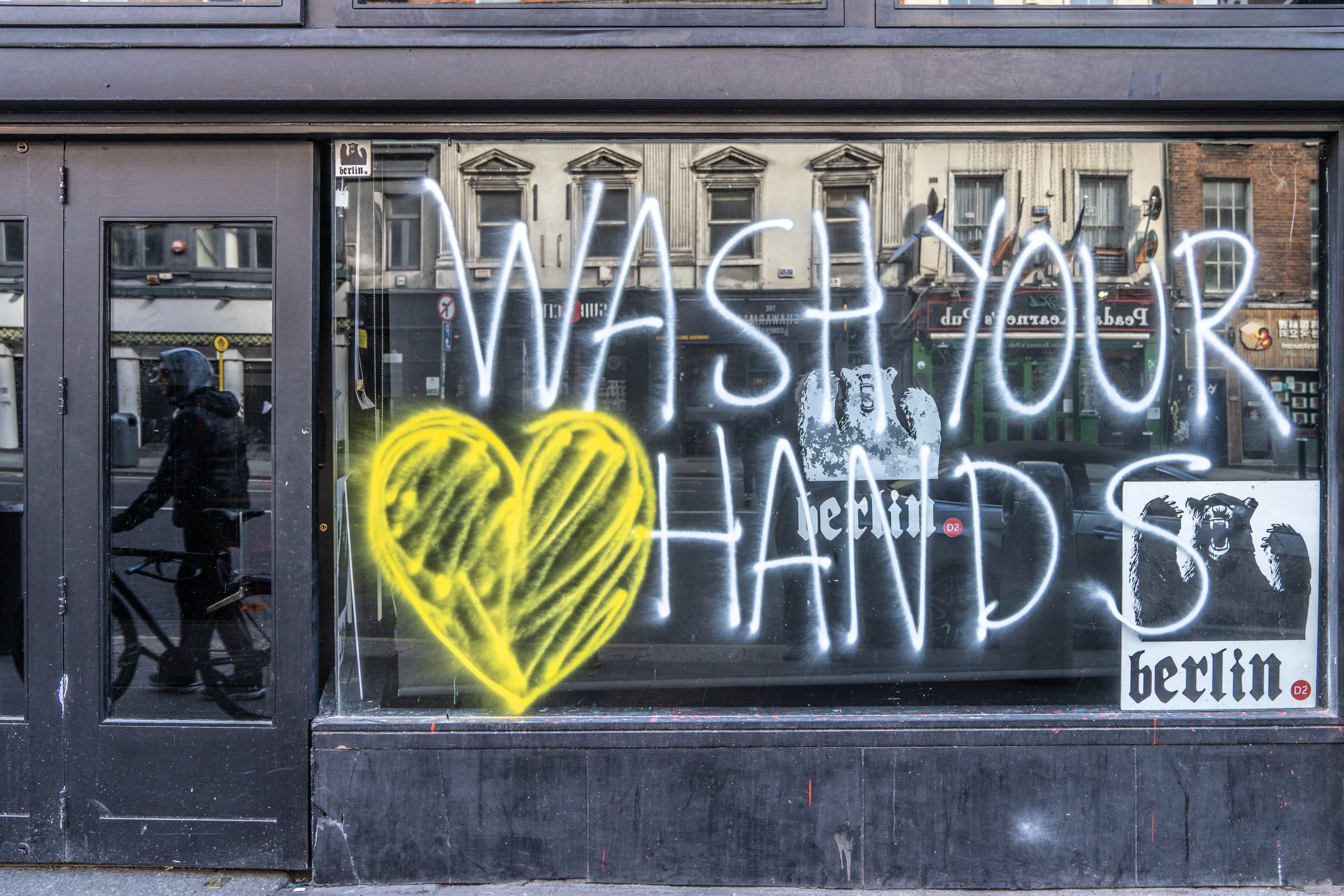
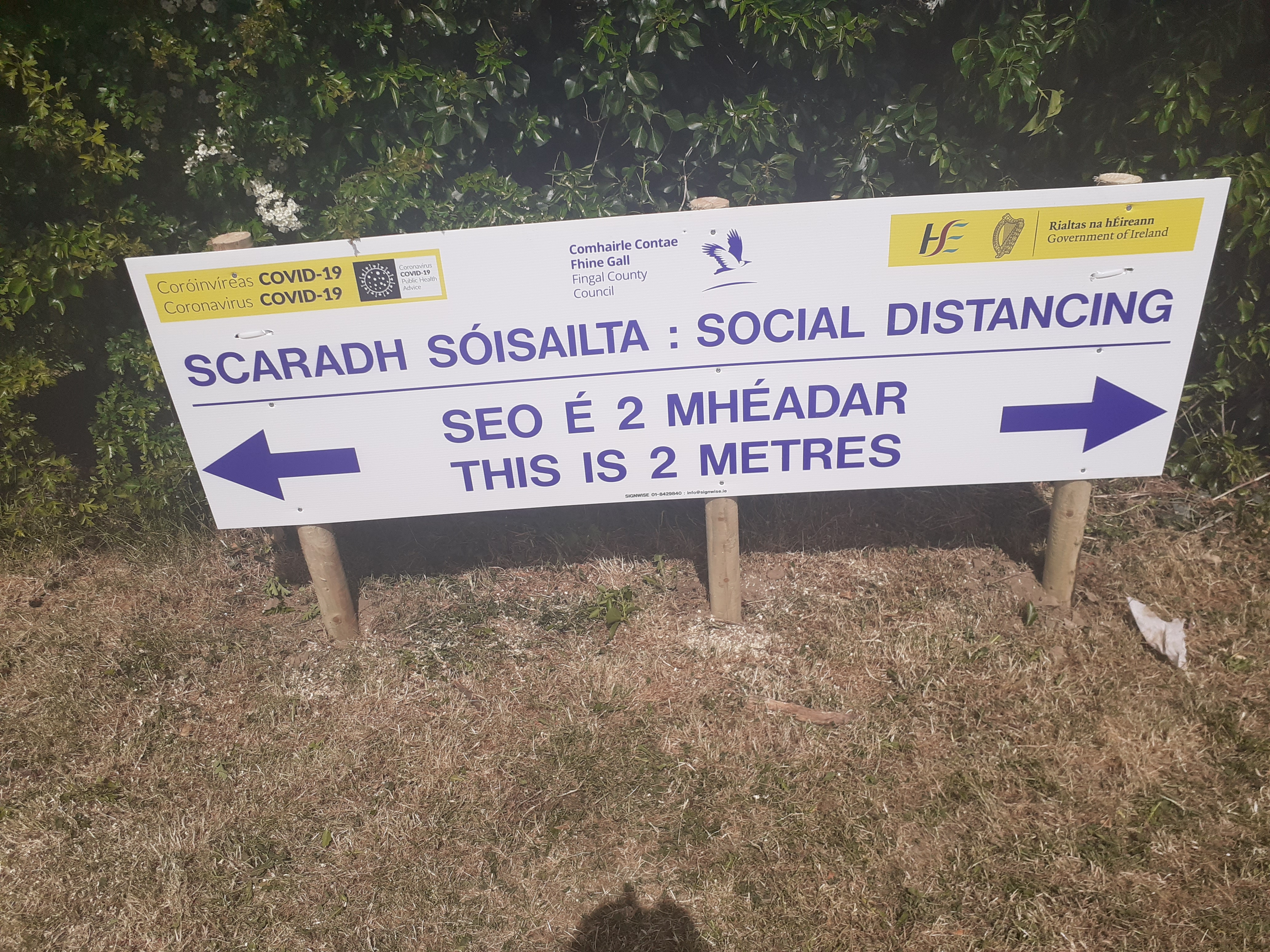
- Clockwise, from top-left: A boarded-up Monsoon store on Grafton Street; Deserted M50 motorway near Castleknock; A COVID-19 street safety sign in Douglas, Cork; COVID-19 social distancing sign in Carpenterstown; "Wash your hands" window message in Dame Street, Dublin; --- Weekly rate: ▲2.35 (22 November 2025) (per 100,000 people)
- Disease: COVID-19
- Pathogen: SARS-CoV-2
- Location: Republic of Ireland
- First outbreak: Wuhan, Hubei, China
- Index case: Dublin
- Arrival date: 29 February 2020 (6 years, 7 months, 2 weeks and 2 days ago)
- Date: As of 22 November 2025
- Confirmed cases: 1,764,987 (+121)
- Hospitalised cases: 73,143 (total as of Week 20, 2024)
- Critical cases: 2,972 (total as of Week 20, 2024)
- Deaths: 9,815 (+1)
- Fatality rate: ▲0.56%
- Test positivity rate: ▼9.7% (31 January 2024); ▼3.3% (Week 11, 2024)
- Vaccinations: 12,744,694 (doses administered); 4,107,865 (at least one dose); 3,819,227 (second dose); 4,817,602 (boosters)

Government website
- Gov.ie – COVID-19 (Coronavirus)

The COVID-19 pandemic in the Republic of Ireland is a part of the worldwide pandemic of coronavirus disease 2019 (COVID-19) caused by severe acute respiratory syndrome coronavirus 2 (SARS-CoV-2). In Ireland, it has resulted in 1,764,987 cases and 9,815 deaths, as of 22 November 2025.

89.4% of those who died were aged 65 or over and 76% had underlying illnesses with a median age of death at 82 years old. During 2020 and 2021, the country had one of the world's lowest excess death rates, which is an overall indicator of the pandemic's impact, at an estimated 12.5 deaths per 100,000 population.

The virus first reached the country in late February 2020 and cases were soon confirmed in all counties. The government first introduced public health and economic measures to mitigate its impact by shutting schools, childcare facilities and cultural institutions in March 2020. Large gatherings were cancelled, including St Patrick's Day festivities. On 27 March, the first stay-at-home order banned all non-essential travel and contact with others. People were made to keep apart in public, and those most at risk were told to cocoon. The Oireachtas passed an emergency act giving the state far-reaching powers to control the virus's spread, and the Gardaí given powers to enforce the lockdown.

The state's first lockdown in 2020 was the longest in Europe, especially for hospitality and retail. It caused a severe recession and an unprecedented rise in unemployment. Infections and deaths dropped to low levels by June and restrictions were gradually lifted, while schools remained closed for summer break. Pubs that served food were allowed to reopen in late June. However, "wet" pubs, or pubs that do not serve food, could not reopen until September. Ireland had the longest closure of pubs compared to other countries in Europe.

In October 2020, another statewide lockdown was imposed following a surge in cases, excluding schools. There was another surge in late December 2020, and on Christmas Eve, another statewide lockdown was imposed. This was soon tightened to include schools, and was one of the strictest in the world. The vaccination programme began on 29 December, and has been praised as one of the most successful rollouts in the world.

In February 2021, the government imposed testing and quarantine rules on incoming travellers for the first time. Infections fell sharply, and schools re-opened in March. The lockdown was gradually lifted from May, but unlike most of Europe, indoor hospitality remained shut. Infections rose again in July due to the Delta variant but there were fewer deaths. Indoor hospitality reopened under strict rules, while vaccinations sped up. Despite Ireland's high vaccination rate, there was another surge in late 2021 due to the Omicron variant, with record-breaking cases being reported. Proof of vaccination or non-infection became mandatory to enter most indoor venues, but the government imposed another curfew on indoor hospitality from 20 December. Cases fell sharply, and the majority of restrictions, including mandatory mask wearing and social distancing, were eased in January and February 2022.

As well as the major strain on Ireland's healthcare service, the pandemic measures severely damaged Ireland's economy, disrupted education and had far-reaching impacts on society, including politics, religion, crime, the arts and sports. In May 2023, it was announced by the Director-General of the World Health Organization that COVID-19 was no longer a public health emergency of international concern. In September 2023, in response to lessons learned from the COVID-19 pandemic, the Irish government approved the establishment of a new health agency focused on infectious diseases, pandemic preparedness, and other emerging public health threats, based on recommendations from the Public Health Reform Expert Advisory Group.

An independent evaluation of the State's response to the pandemic, chaired by Anne Scott, was established in 2024, and in 2026 held public hearings and expert discussions examining health, social and economic impacts and lessons for future public health emergencies, with early findings highlighting impacts on vulnerable groups and preparedness challenges.

== Statistics ==
The surveillance of COVID-19 cases was integrated into existing national Computerised Infectious Disease Reporting (CIDR) system since COVID-19 was made a notifiable disease on 20 February 2020. CIDR is the information system used to manage the surveillance and control of infectious diseases in Ireland, both at regional and national level. Daily epidemiological reports on COVID-19 were prepared by the Health Protection Surveillance Centre (HPSC) for the National Public Health Emergency Team (NPHET). Additional information was provided by the Health Service Executive (HSE) in its daily operations updates.

In February 2022 the Health Protection Surveillance Centre (HPSC) launched their Epidemiology of COVID-19 in Ireland Data Hub. The Data Hub provided the latest data relating to cases, deaths and outbreaks in Ireland.

On 24 April 2020, a daily high of 220 deaths from COVID-19 were reported in Ireland, while on 8 January 2022, a high of 26,122 new cases were recorded.

By 13 November 2023, the Department of Health had confirmed 1,725,026 cases and 9,366 deaths; a rate of 342,416 cases per million (34.2% of the population), 1,866 deaths per million (0.19% of the population) and 2,606,161 tests per million population.

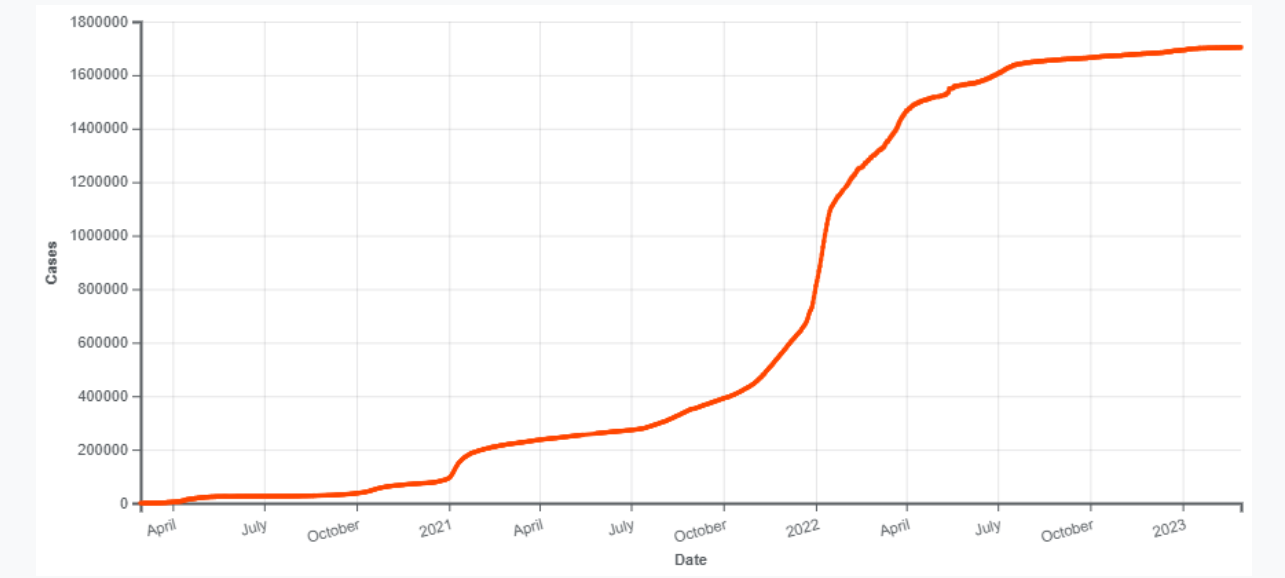
Total COVID-19 PCR cases (to 6 March 2023)

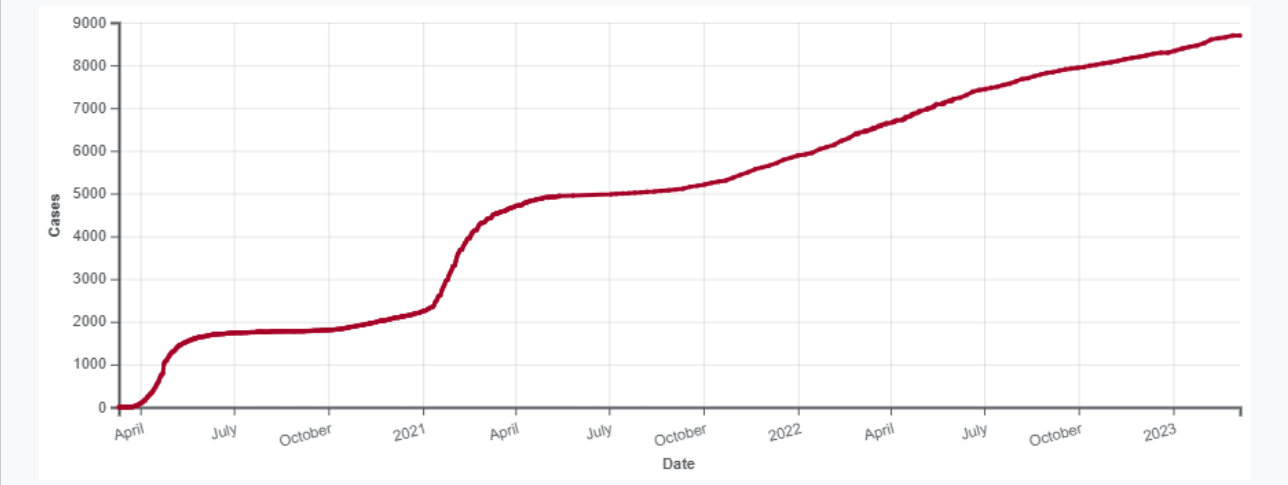
Total COVID-19 deaths (to 6 March 2023)

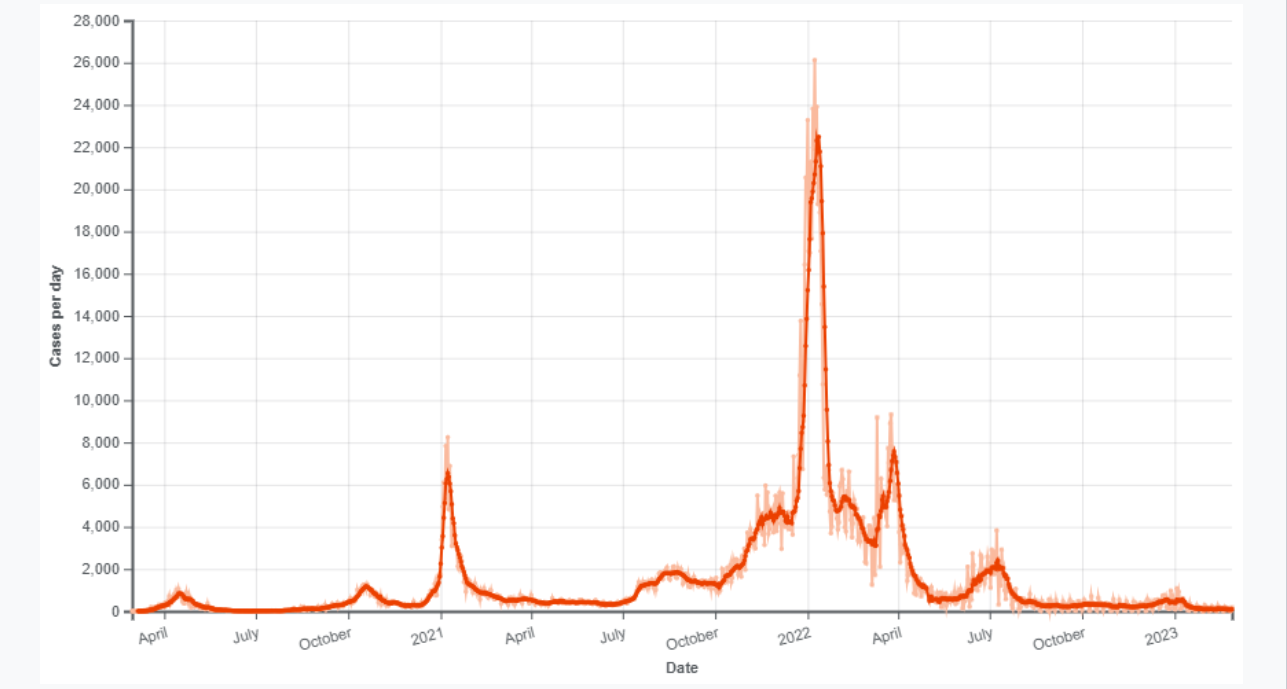
Daily new PCR-confirmed cases with 7-day moving average (to 6 March 2023)

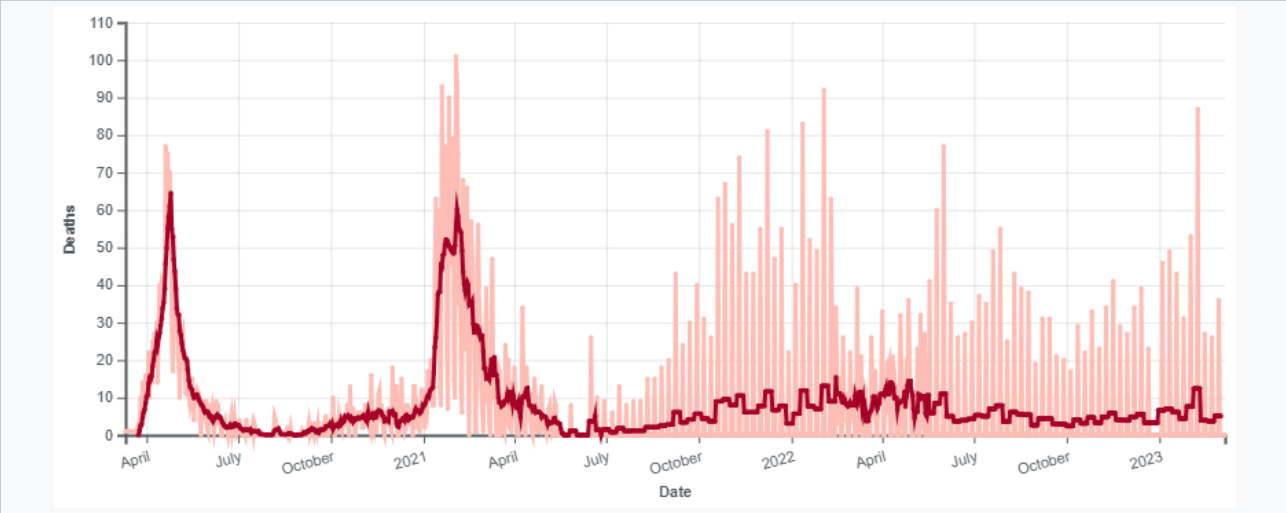
Daily new deaths with 7-day moving average (to 6 March 2023)

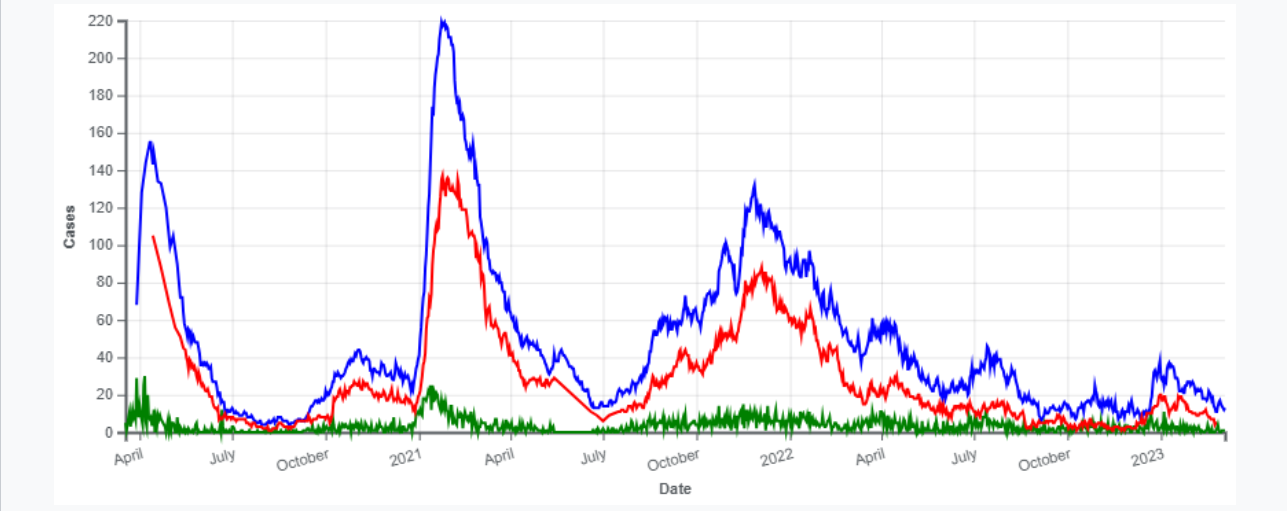
Active ICU cases, ventilated and new ICU admissions (to 6 March 2023)
Currently in ICU
Currently ventilated
Daily admitted to ICU

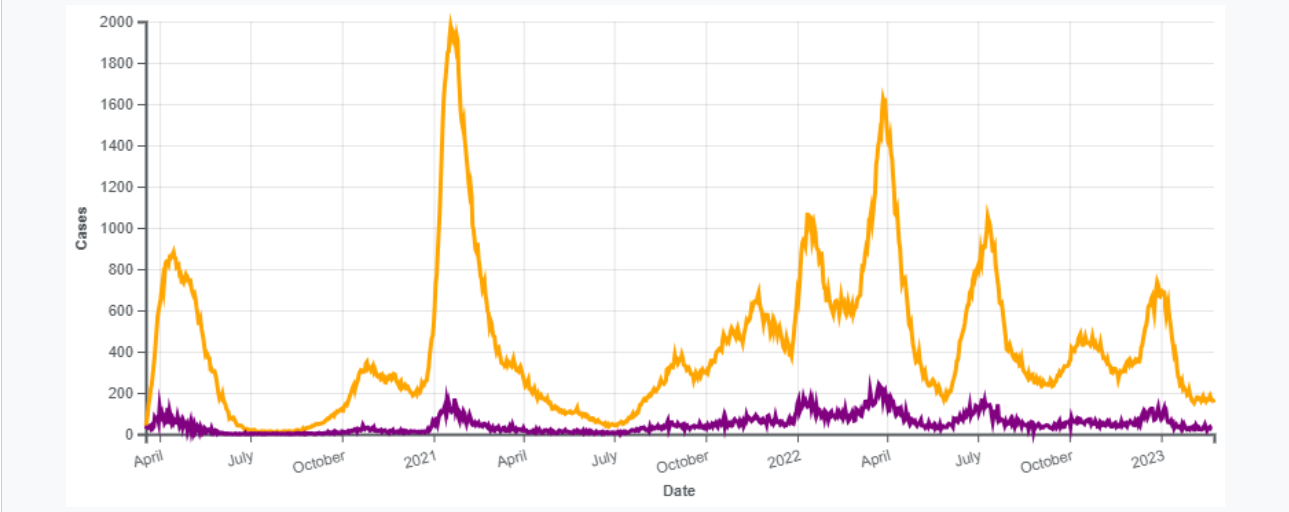
Currently hospitalised and daily admissions (to 24 February 2023)
Currently hospitalised
Daily admitted to hospital

COVID-19 variant cases in Ireland (14 August 2024)
| Virus variant | Number of cases |
|---|---|
Variants of concern
| Omicron (Note: Includes Omicron sublineages) | 64,483 |
| Delta (Note: Includes Delta sublineages) | 28,990 |
| Alpha | 16,130 |
| Beta | 77 |
| Gamma | 33 |
Variants of interest
| Lambda | 4 |
| Mu | 4 |
| Other | 1,639 |
| Total | 111,252 |

Age profile of cases to 13 November 2023
| Age | Cases |
|---|---|
| 0–4 | 73,100 |
| 5–14 | 199,879 |
| 15–24 | 262,529 |
| 25–34 | 292,423 |
| 35–44 | 320,117 |
| 45–54 | 245,407 |
| 55–64 | 161,444 |
| 65–74 | 87,132 |
| 75–84 | 52,942 |
| 85+ | 29,929 |
Median age: 36; Mean age: 36; Range: 0-108

Age profile of deaths to 30 March 2024
| Age | Deaths |
|---|---|
| 0–24 | 18(0.19%) |
| 25–34 | 30(0.31%) |
| 35–44 | 93(0.97%) |
| 45–54 | 231(2.42%) |
| 55–64 | 583(6.1%) |
| 65–74 | 1,536(16.07%) |
| 75–84 | 3,139(32.84%) |
| 85+ | 3,923(41.04%) |
| HCW | 23 |
| Unknown | 6(0.06%) |
Median age: 82; Mean age: 80;

Age profile of hospitalised cases to 13 November 2023
| Age | Number of cases |
|---|---|
| 0–4 | 2,779 |
| 5–14 | 1,330 |
| 15–24 | 2,804 |
| 25–34 | 4,688 |
| 35–44 | 5,197 |
| 45–54 | 5,636 |
| 55–64 | 7,713 |
| 65–74 | 11,487 |
| 75–84 | 15,751 |
| 85+ | 10,610 |
Total hospitalised cases: 68,002; Total ICU cases: 2,942

Gender of COVID-19 cases to 13 November 2023
| Gender | Number of cases (%) |
|---|---|
| Female | 922,009(53.45%) |
| Male | 802,830(46.54%) |
| Unknown | 185(0.01%) |
Total = 1,725,026

Gender of COVID-19 deaths to 30 March 2024
| Gender | Number of deaths (%) |
|---|---|
| Female | 4,460(46.66%) |
| Male | 5,099(53.34%) |
| Unknown | 0(0.00%) |

PCR cases and deaths by county (to midnight 31 July 2023)
| County: | Confirmed Cases: | Confirmed Deaths: |
|---|---|---|
| Dublin | 515,595 | 3,007 |
| Cork | 174,974 | 919 |
| Galway | 92,642 | 351 |
| Kildare | 85,218 | 506 |
| Limerick | 73,687 | 432 |
| Meath | 71,214 | 312 |
| Donegal | 61,831 | 340 |
| Tipperary | 54,909 | 243 |
| Louth | 54,593 | 349 |
| Wexford | 46,943 | 311 |
| Kerry | 46,479 | 233 |
| Wicklow | 44,576 | 262 |
| Waterford | 42,989 | 243 |
| Mayo | 41,814 | 423 |
| Clare | 40,336 | 229 |
| Westmeath | 34,941 | 174 |
| Kilkenny | 33,147 | 178 |
| Laois | 30,431 | 157 |
| Offaly | 28,133 | 155 |
| Cavan | 27,183 | 191 |
| Carlow | 24,338 | 129 |
| Monaghan | 23,453 | 150 |
| Roscommon | 23,064 | 146 |
| Sligo | 21,724 | 79 |
| Longford | 15,523 | 68 |
| Leitrim | 10,667 | 56 |
| Total: | 1,715,065 | 9,777 |

== Timeline ==
=== First Wave ===
The National Public Health Emergency Team (NPHET), a group within the Department of Health, began monitoring the spread of the virus before it was confirmed to have reached Ireland. The Coronavirus Expert Advisory Group—a subgroup of NPHET chaired by Dr Cillian de Gascun, the UCD-based Director of the National Virus Reference Laboratory – met for the first time on 5 February in Dublin.

On 27 February, the first case on the island of Ireland was announced—a woman from Belfast who had travelled from Northern Italy through Dublin Airport. Two days later, on 29 February, the first confirmed case in the Republic of Ireland was announced involving a male student from the east of the country, who had arrived there from Northern Italy. Authorities shut a secondary school linked to the case as a precautionary measure.

On 11 March, an elderly patient in Naas General Hospital in County Kildare (south-west of the country's capital city, Dublin) became Ireland's first fatality from the virus.

On 12 March, Taoiseach Leo Varadkar announced the closure of all schools, colleges and childcare facilities until 29 March. The announcement came one day after the World Health Organization formally declared the outbreak a pandemic.

On 27 March, Taoiseach Varadkar announced a national stay-at-home order with a series of measures which he summed up as: "Stay at Home". The measures, which coincided with an escalating death toll, were also a response to increased reliance on intensive care units (ICUs) to treat critically ill patients, and an attempt to lower this number before capacity was reached.

On 16 April, the National Public Health Emergency Team reported that lockdown and other measures had driven the growth rate of the pandemic "as low as it needs to be" and was "close to zero".

On 1 May, Taoiseach Varadkar announced the extension of the current restrictions to 18 May at the earliest. A roadmap to easing restrictions in Ireland that included five stages was adopted by the government and subsequently published online.

=== Second Wave ===
On 15 September, the Government announced a medium-term plan for living with COVID-19 that included five levels of restrictions.

| Level | Social & Family Gatherings | Weddings | Indoor & Outdoor Events | Sports Training, Matches & Events | Gyms, Pools & Leisure Centres | Religious Services | Restaurants, Cafés & Pubs | Hotels, Guesthouses & B&Bs | Retail & Services | Indoor Cultural Venues | Domestic Travel | Public Transport | Schools & Childcare |
|---|---|---|---|---|---|---|---|---|---|---|---|---|---|
| 1 | Maximum 10 from 3 other households | Maximum 100 people can attend | Indoor: 100/200 depending on venue size; Outdoor: 200/500 depending on venue size | Normal training with protective measures; Matches & Events: 100 indoors/200 outdoor/500 stadia | Open with protective measures | 50 people can attend | Open with protective measures | Open with protective measures | Open with protective measures | Open with protective measures | No restrictions | Off-peak hours | Open with protective measures |
| 2 | Maximum 6 from 3 other households | Maximum 50 people can attend | Indoor: 50/100 depending on venue size; Outdoor: 100/200 depending on venue size | Indoor training: pods of 6; Outdoor training: pods of 15; Matches & Events: 50 indoors/100 outdoors/200 stadia | Open with protective measures | 50 people can attend | Groups of 6 from up to 3 households | Open with protective measures | Open with protective measures | Open with protective measures | No restrictions | 50% capacity / peak-hours prioritised | Open with protective measures |
| 3 | Maximum 6 from 1 other household | Maximum 25 people can attend | No organised indoor events; Outdoor: gatherings of up to 15 | Indoor training: 1 individual only; Outdoor training: pods of 15 (non-contact); Matches & Events: except specific exemptions | Individual training only | Services move online; 25 people can attend funerals | Range of restrictions up to and including no indoor dining | Services limited to residents only | Open with protective measures | Venues closed | Stay in your county | 50% capacity, use only when necessary | Open with protective measures |
| 4 | No visitors | Maximum 6 people can attend | No organised indoor events; Outdoor: gatherings of up to 15 | Indoor training: 1 individual only; Outdoor training: pods of 15 (non-contact); Matches & Events: except specific exemptions | Closed | Services move online; 25 people can attend funerals | Outdoor dining (maximum 15 people), takeaway or delivery | Existing guests & essential purposes only | Primarily outdoor essential retail/services | Venues closed | Stay in your county | 25% capacity, avoid public transport | Open with protective measures |
| 5 | No visitors | Maximum 6 people can attend | No organised indoor/outdoor events | Individual training only & no events | Closed | Services move online; 10 people can attend funerals | Takeaway or delivery only | Essential purposes only | Essential retail only | Venues closed | Stay at home, exercise within 5 km | 25% capacity, avoid public transport | Recommendations based on situation & evidence at time |

Resilience and recovery 2020-2021: Plan for living with COVID-19, announced on 15 September 2020.

On 4 October, following an increase in cases, the National Public Health Emergency Team recommended the highest level of restrictions for the entire country – Level 5 for four weeks. The Government rejected NPHET's recommendation, and instead moved every county in Ireland to Level 3 COVID-19 restrictions with improved enforcement and indoor dining in pubs and restaurants banned. On 19 October, the Government agreed to move the entire country to Level 5 lockdown restrictions.

COVID-19 restrictions began to be eased from 1 December, with the reopening of all non-essential retail shops, hair and beauty providers, gyms and leisure centres, cinemas, museums and galleries, while thousands of restaurants, cafés, gastropubs and hotel restaurants reopened three days later.

=== Third Wave ===
On 21 December, the Chair of the NPHET Irish Epidemiological Modelling Advisory Group Philip Nolan announced that a third wave of COVID-19 in Ireland was clearly underway.

On 22 December, the Government agreed to move the entire country to Level 5 lockdown restrictions with a number of adjustments from Christmas Eve until 12 January 2021 at the earliest.

On Christmas Day, Chief Medical Officer Tony Holohan confirmed that the new Alpha variant of COVID-19 had been detected in the Republic of Ireland by whole genome sequencing at the National Virus Reference Laboratory in University College Dublin. By week 2 of 2021, the variant had become the dominant strain in Ireland.

On 31 December, a further 1,620 cases and 12 deaths were reported, bringing the end of 2020 totals to 91,779 cases and 2,237 deaths.

On 2 January 2021, it was revealed that there were approximately 9,000 positive COVID-19 tests not yet logged on the HSE's IT systems, due to both limitations in the software; and lack of staff to check and input details, meaning there is an effective ceiling of approximately 1,700 to 2,000 cases that can be logged each day.

On 6 January, COVID-19 restrictions were re-imposed statewide, which included the closure of schools.

On 8 January, the Beta variant of COVID-19 arrived in Ireland.

On 30 January, Chief Medical Officer Tony Holohan announced that more cases had been confirmed in one month than throughout 2020 with over 1,000 deaths and more than 100,000 cases confirmed in January.

On 10 February, the World Health Organization praised Ireland's recovery from the third wave of COVID-19 but warned of the danger of a fourth wave.

COVID-19 restrictions began to be eased throughout the summer, despite the arrival of the Delta variant in June. By 24 June, 210 cases of the Delta variant had been detected in Ireland.

=== Fourth Wave ===

People who were awaiting full vaccination were urged to "take every precaution", with the highest cases among the 16–34 age cohorts, a significant shift from previous waves. On 17 July, a further 1,377 cases were reported, the highest recorded in six months.

Despite the increasing cases, the Government agreed that indoor dining in pubs and restaurants could resume on Monday 26 July for fully vaccinated and COVID-19 recovered people, after President Michael D. Higgins signed the legislation underpinning new guidelines into law.

Daily cases began to surge again in October. A further 2,002 cases were reported on 8 October.

Remaining COVID-19 restrictions, including the reopening of nightclubs and requirements on social distancing, mask wearing and vaccination certificates, were due to be eased on 22 October. On the day nightclubs reopened, a further 2,466 cases were reported, the highest daily number since 21 January.

On 11 November, a 14-year-old teenager became Ireland's youngest person to die with COVID-19. A further 5,959 cases were reported on 20 November.

On 1 December, the Omicron variant arrived in Ireland. On 3 December, COVID-19 restrictions were re-imposed, with nightclubs to close, bars and restaurants to revert to six adults per table and no multiple table bookings allowed, indoor cultural and sporting events to operate at 50% capacity, a maximum of four households allowed to meet indoors and the requirement of vaccination certificates extended to gyms, leisure centres and hotel bars. Cases of the Omicron variant continued to increase rapidly.

=== Fifth Wave ===
On 15 December, Chief Medical Officer Tony Holohan urged people to take precautions to avoid being in isolation for Christmas.

A fifth wave of COVID-19 had arrived in Ireland on 19 December, according to the Health Protection Surveillance Centre.

Further COVID-19 restrictions were imposed on 20 December for the Christmas period, with an 8pm closing time for bars, restaurants, live events, cinemas and theatres. On 19 December, the Omicron variant became Ireland's dominant variant after it was confirmed that 52% of cases were now due to the variant.

On Christmas Day, a record 13,765 cases were reported. A record 20,554 cases were reported on 30 December, as it was confirmed that 92% of cases were now due to the Omicron variant.

On 31 December, a further 20,110 cases were reported, bringing the end of 2021 totals to 788,559 cases and 5,912 deaths. On New Year's Day, 23,281 cases were recorded, as health officials warned that the true number of cases was likely to be higher, due to increased pressure on the PCR testing system. On 8 January, a record 26,122 cases were reported – the highest daily number reported since the pandemic began. By 10 January, 1,000,000 total cases had been confirmed, with more cases recorded in the first five days of 2022 than in the whole of 2020.

Cases fell sharply after the 8 January peak, and on 21 January, Taoiseach Micheál Martin announced the easing of almost all COVID-19 restrictions, with the requirements of vaccine certificates and social distancing to end, restrictions on household visits and capacity limits for indoor and outdoor events to end, nightclubs to reopen and pubs and restaurants to resume normal trading times, while rules on isolation and the wearing of masks in certain settings would remain. Remaining restrictions were agreed to be removed from 28 February, with mask wearing in schools, indoor retail settings and on public transport to be voluntary, restrictions in schools to end and testing to be scaled back, while it was agreed that the National Public Health Emergency Team (NPHET) be disbanded.

Celebrations took place across the country to mark Saint Patrick's Day, following a two-year absence due to COVID-19, with around 400,000 people attending festivities in Dublin. Figures showed on 21 March that 63,954 people had tested positive for COVID-19 since St Patrick's Day. The World Health Organization said Ireland eased restrictions too "brutally" and was now seeing a spike in cases as a result.

A new COVID-19 advisory group was established on 8 April 2022. By early April, case numbers began to decrease but remained high. On 16 April, hospital and ICU numbers continued to decrease to its lowest levels since 5 March.

== Vaccines ==
COVID-19 vaccination in the Republic of Ireland began on 29 December 2020. Annie Lynch, a 79-year-old woman, became the first person in the Republic of Ireland to receive the Pfizer–BioNTech COVID-19 vaccine at St. James's Hospital, Dublin, and received the second dose three weeks later on Tuesday 19 January 2021.

Maura Byrne, a 95-year-old woman, became the first nursing home resident in the Republic of Ireland to receive the Pfizer COVID-19 vaccine on 5 January 2021, while Dr Eavan Muldoon, an infectious diseases consultant, became the first healthcare worker in the Mater University Hospital to receive the vaccine.

By the end of January, three effective vaccines of Pfizer–BioNTech, Moderna and Oxford–AstraZeneca were in use in Ireland.

By 10 September 2021, 90% of adults in Ireland were fully vaccinated against COVID-19.

Ireland's vaccination rollout has been praised as one of the most successful rollouts in the world and was ranked number one in the European Union in terms of its percentage of adult population fully vaccinated, and was also ranked number one in the EU for the number of booster vaccines administered.

A booster programme began in late September 2021 and a second and third booster programme began throughout 2022.

== Testing ==
The developing and delivering of testing of Ireland was led by the staff in the National Virus Reference Laboratory. With the acquisition of the sequence of the virus, they used this to develop and validate in-house assays in advance of obtaining any commercial diagnostic kits. The NVRL played a vital role in the early detection of COVID-19 cases in Ireland, and began playing a vital role in the detection of new variants of COVID-19 in 2021.

== Cases ==
In 2024, the Irish Government established an independent evaluation of the State's response to the COVID-19 pandemic, chaired by Anne Scott. In 2026, the evaluation continued, with public hearings and expert discussions examining health, social and economic impacts and preparedness for future public health emergencies. Early discussions highlighted concerns about preparedness and public communication, with some experts stating Ireland may be no better prepared for a future pandemic.

== Impacts ==
=== Economy ===
Like most countries in the world, the pandemic's emergence and the lockdowns it led to deeply impacted the Irish economy, causing it to plunge into a recession. While there were job losses in all sectors primarily due to stay-at-home orders, individuals working in tourism, hospitality, food and retail were most likely to be affected.

A COVID-19 Pandemic Unemployment Payment and a Temporary COVID-19 Wage Subsidy Scheme were set up.

=== Society ===
The social impact of the pandemic had far-reaching consequences in the country that went beyond the spread of the disease itself and efforts to quarantine it, including political, criminal, religious, educational, artistic and sporting implications.

The 2020 Leaving Certificate, 2020–2021 Junior Certificate and all 2020–2021 Irish language summer courses in the Gaeltacht were cancelled. The 2020 Dublin Horse Show was cancelled, the first time since 1940 that the event did not occur. The Tidy Towns competition was cancelled for the first time in its 62-year history. The Rose of Tralee was cancelled for the first time in its 61-year history. The 2020 National Ploughing Championships and Ballinasloe Horse Fair also did not take place. The All-Ireland Senior Football Championship and All-Ireland Senior Hurling Championship were completed in December in between the second and third waves of the virus to hit Ireland, maintaining their record of having been held annually since 1887.

== Gallery ==
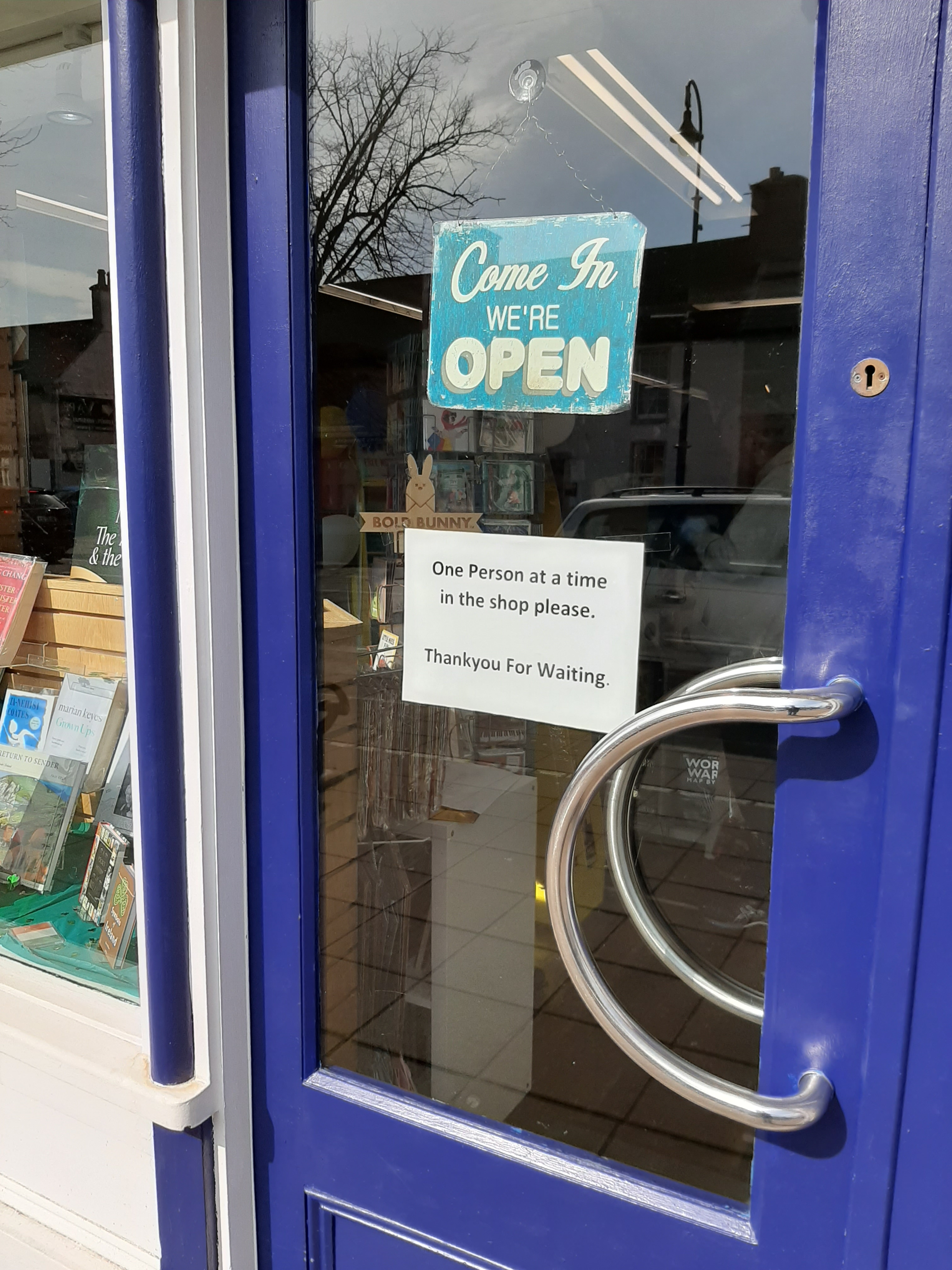
Shop door showing social distancing measures.

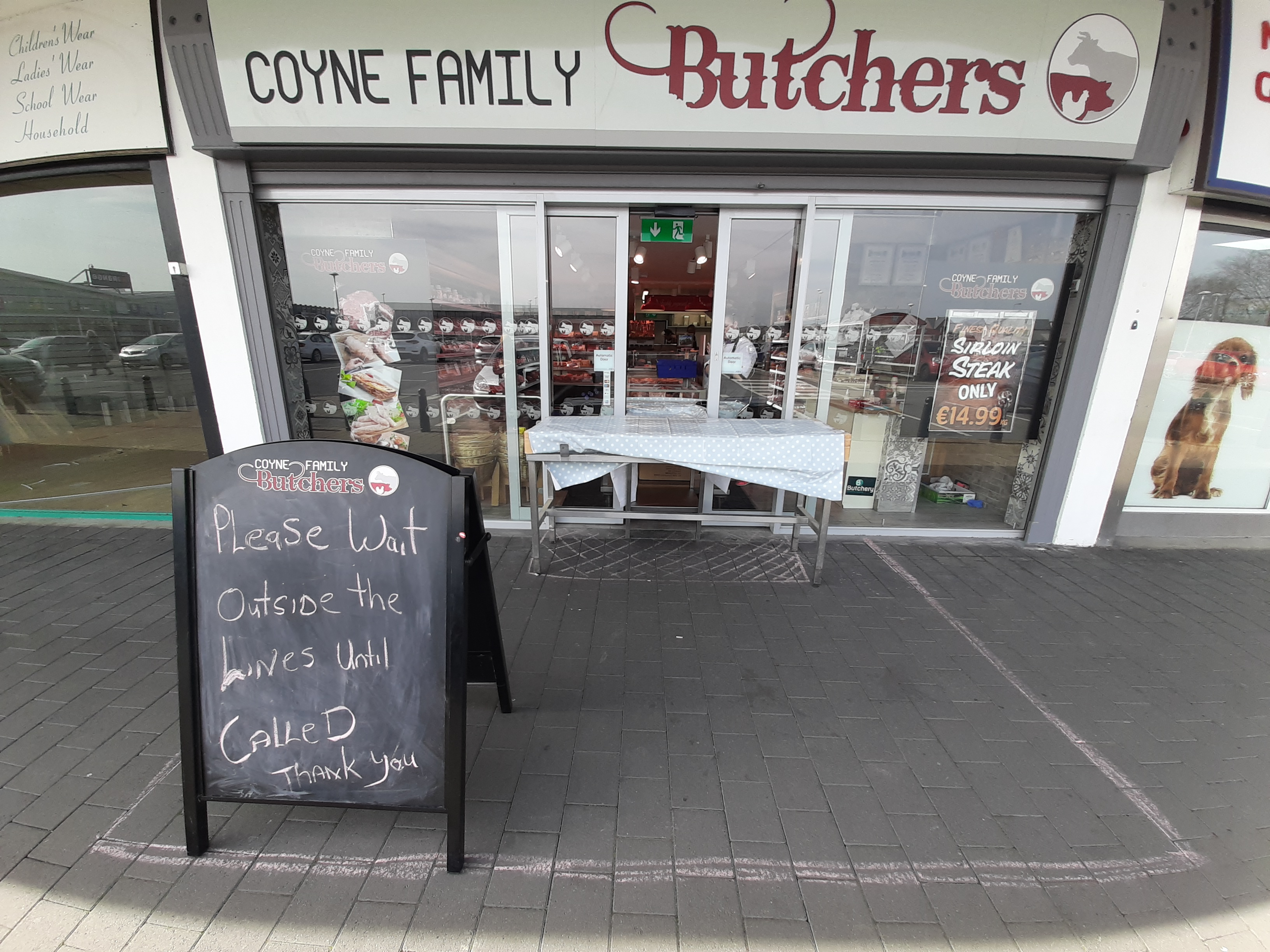
Irish butcher implementing ad hoc social distancing measures.

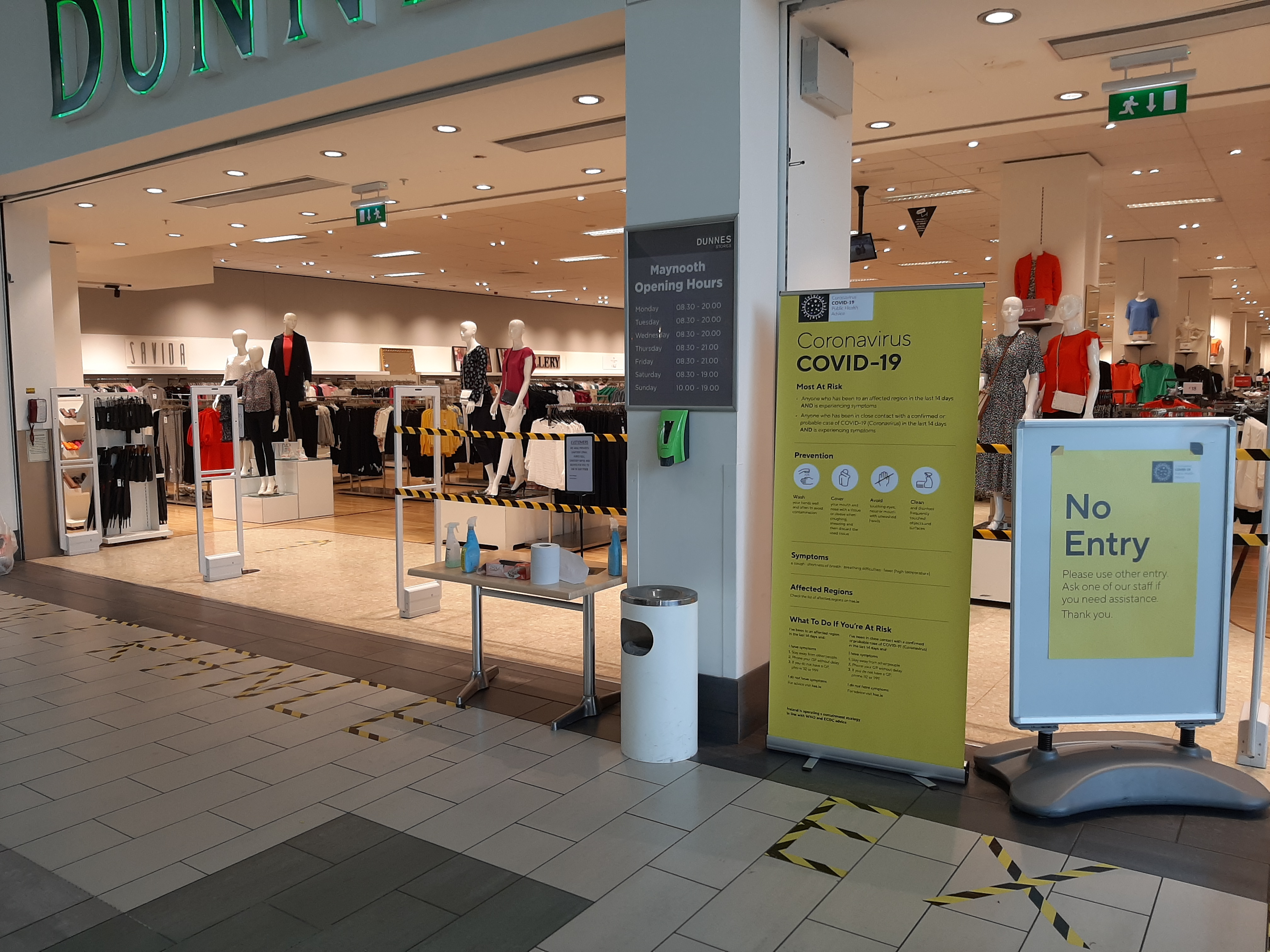
Supermarket: a one-way system, instructions on social distancing, disposable gloves, trolley cleaning supplies.

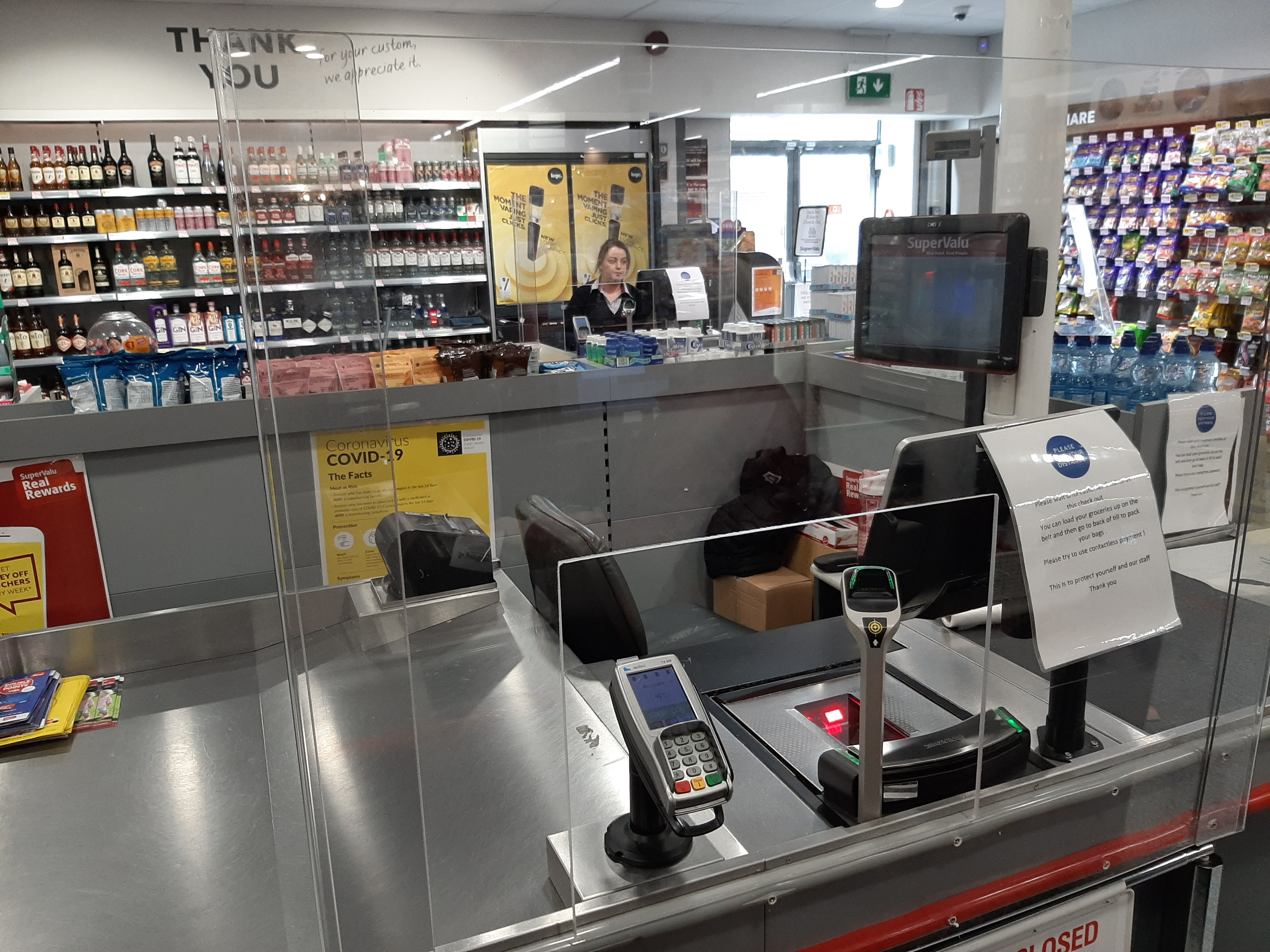
Temporary protection for employees deployed in a grocery store during the pandemic.

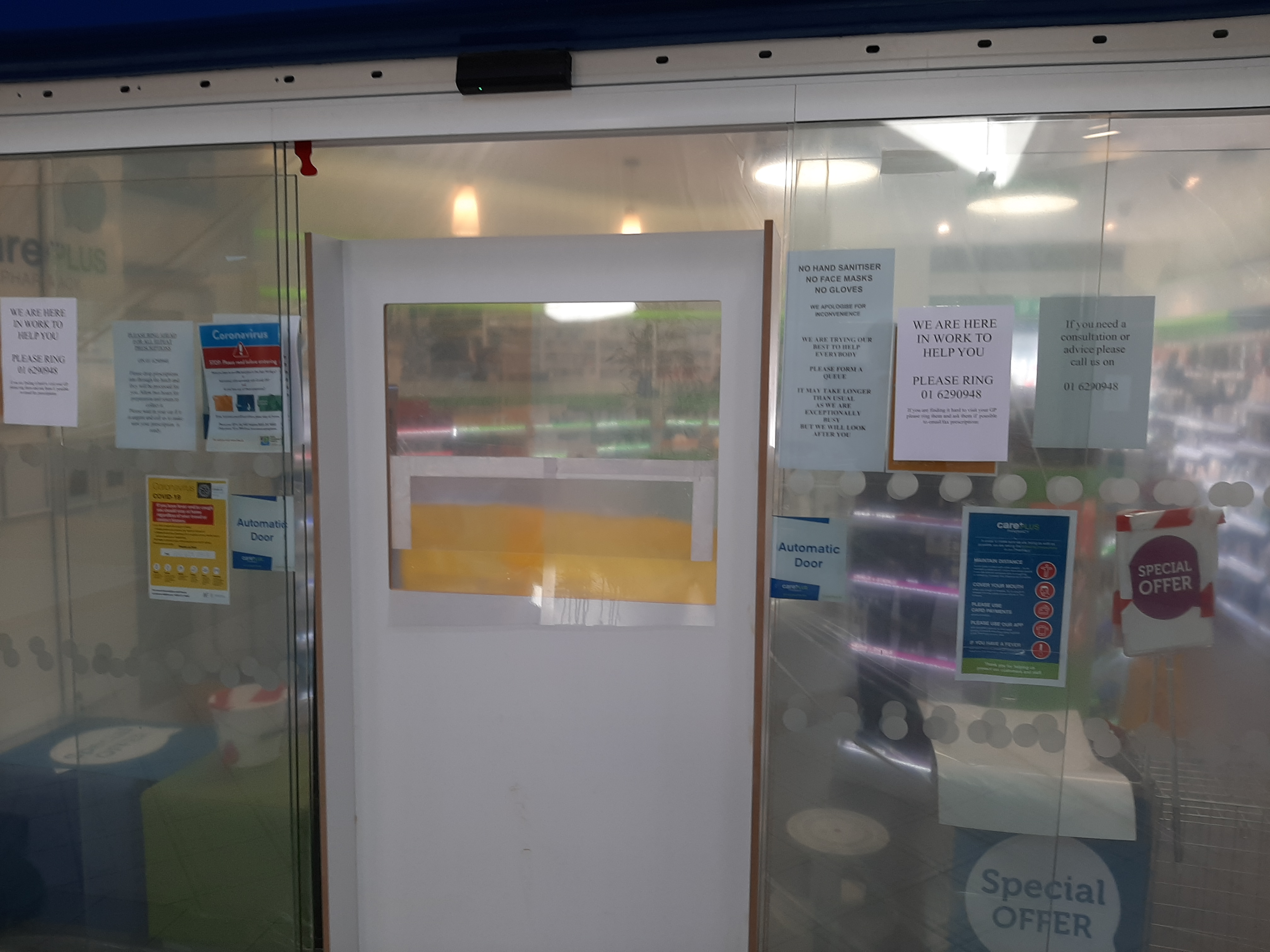
Pharmacy where the door has been replaced with a hatch for exchanging goods.

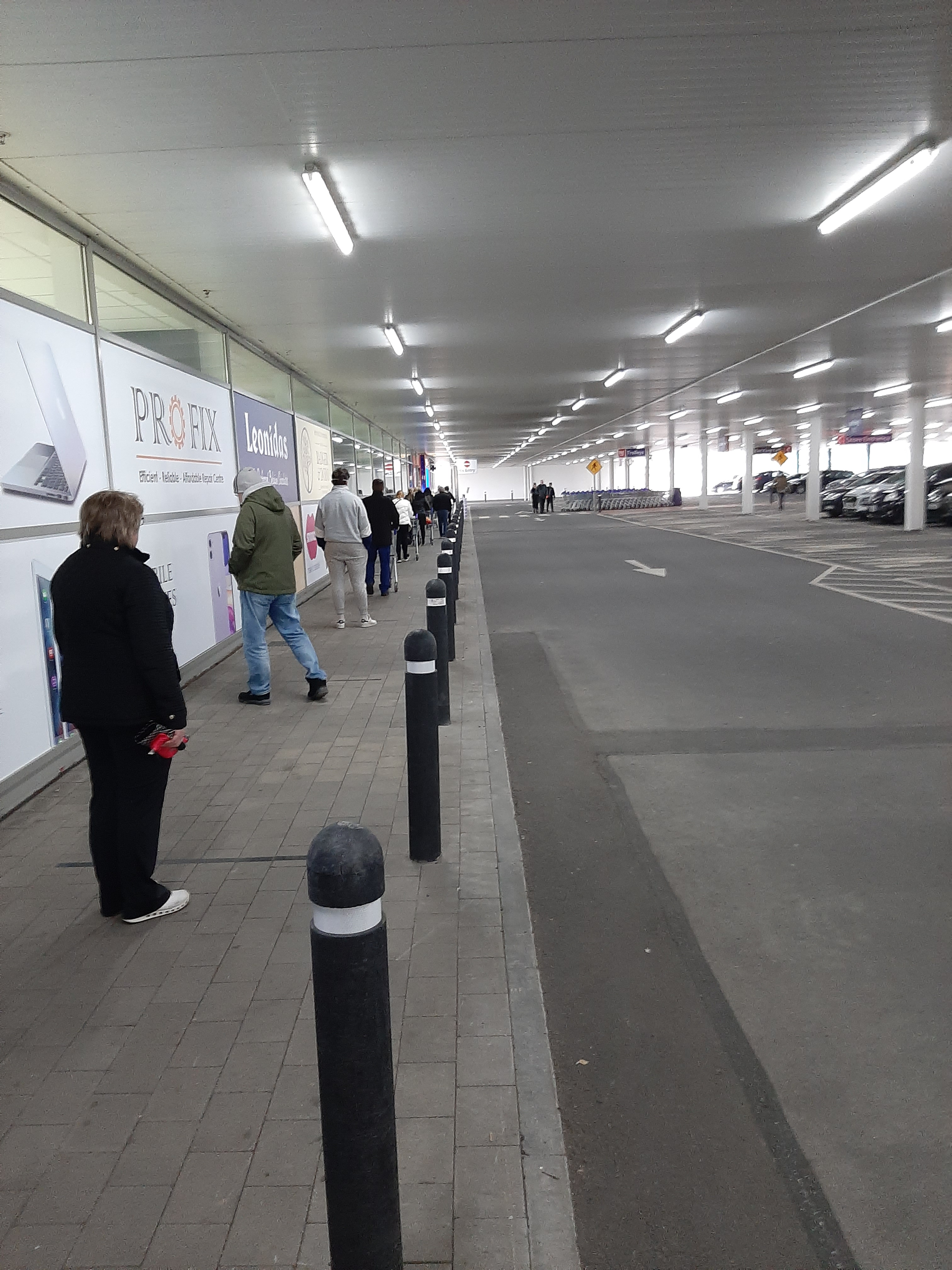
People queueing at an Irish supermarket, March 2020; strips of black tape on the ground to demarcate 2-metre gaps.

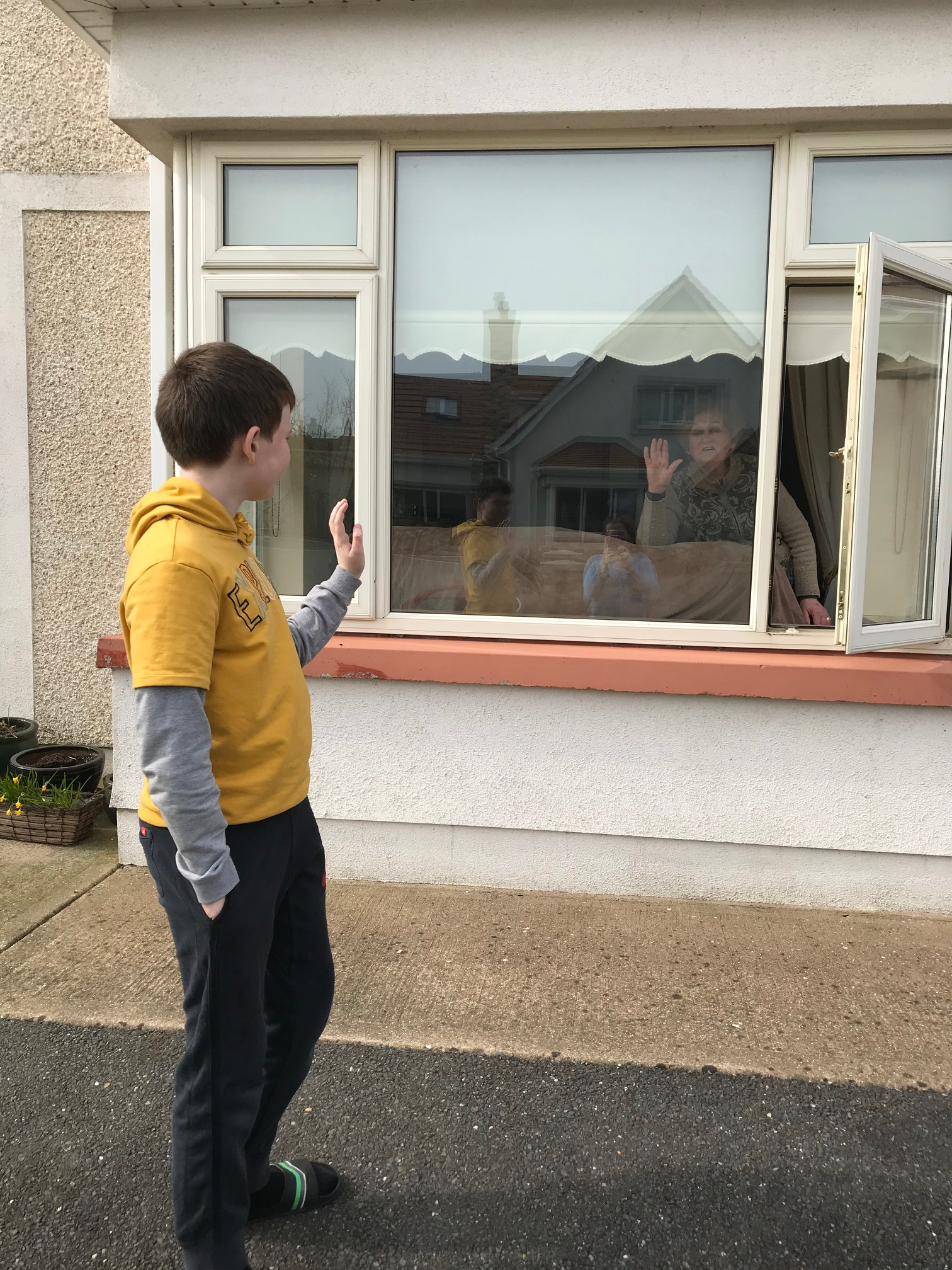
A grandson visits his grandmother who is "cocooning" in her home.

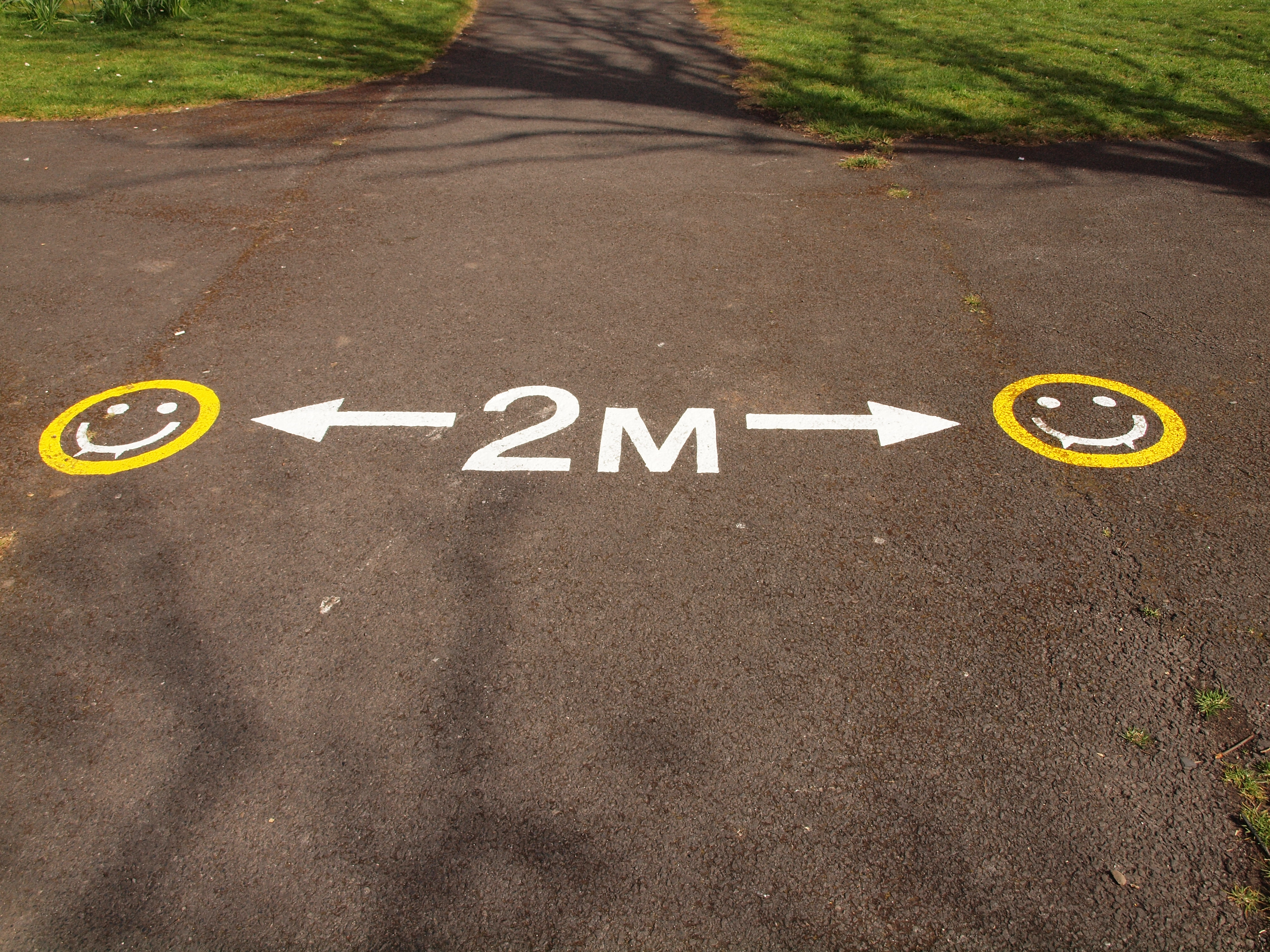
Two-metre marking for visitors to Bram Stoker Park in Marino, Dublin.

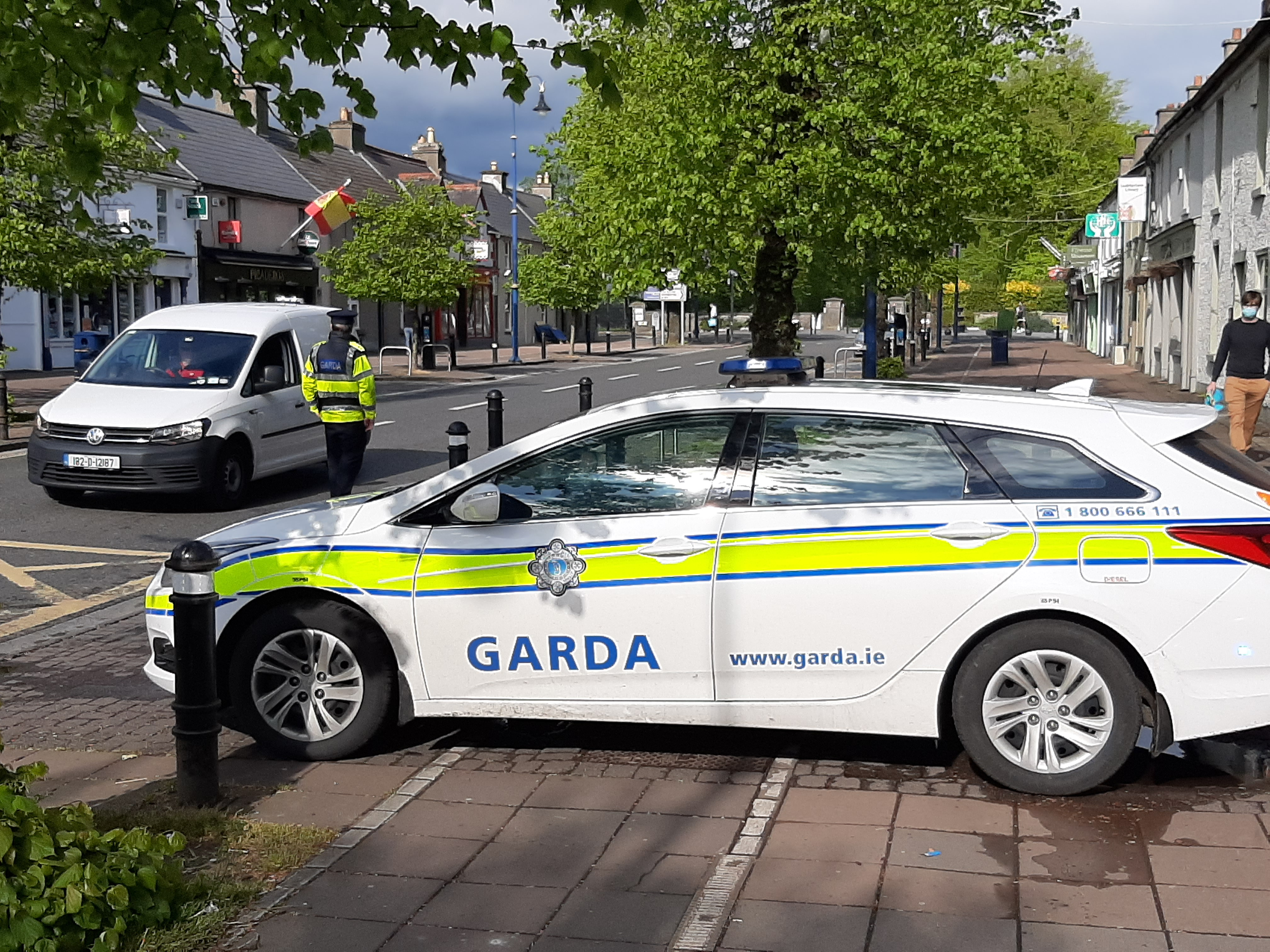
A garda checkpoint on the main street of Maynooth, April 2020.

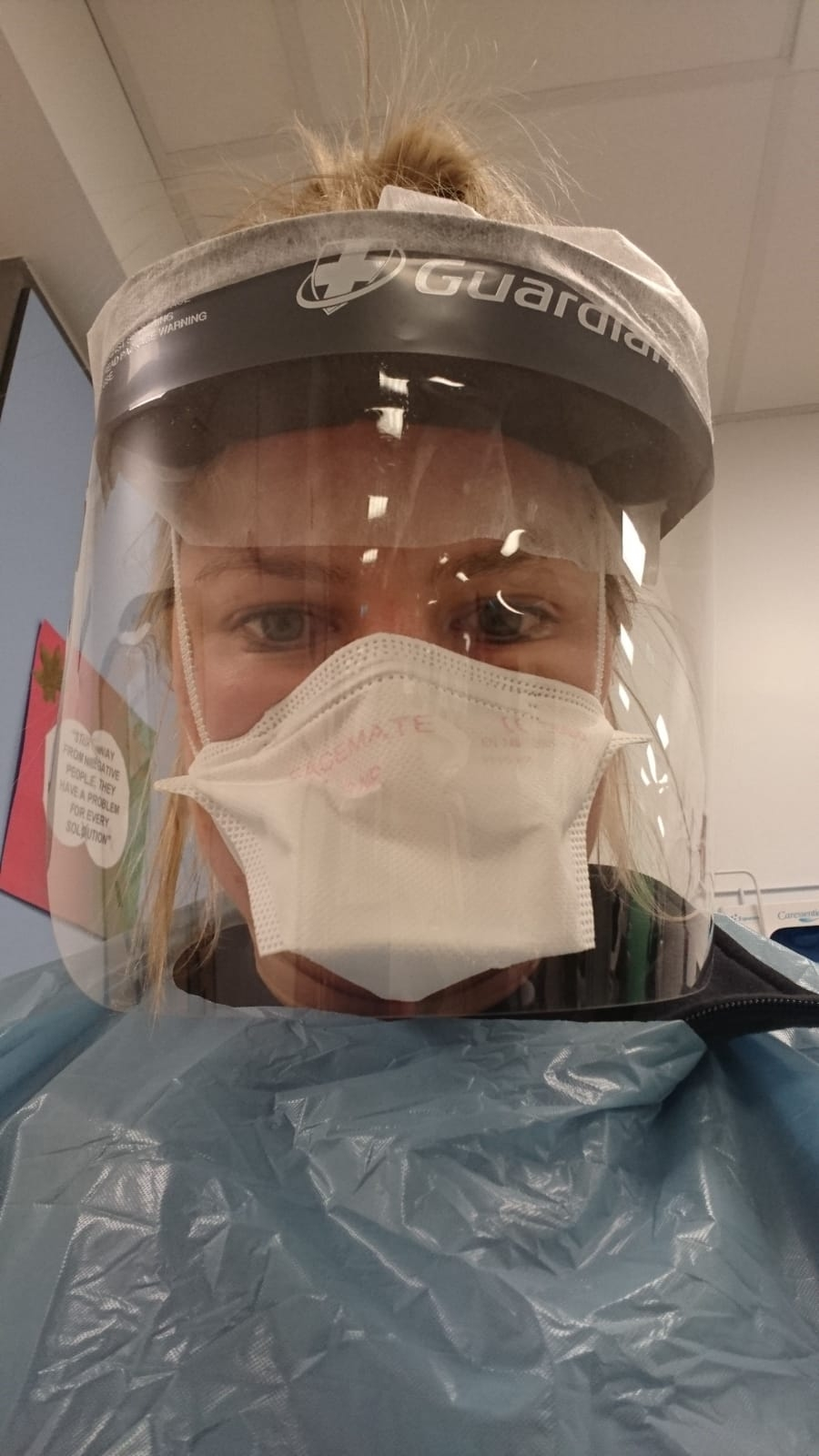
An Irish paramedic en route to a so-called "query case" during the pandemic in Ireland.

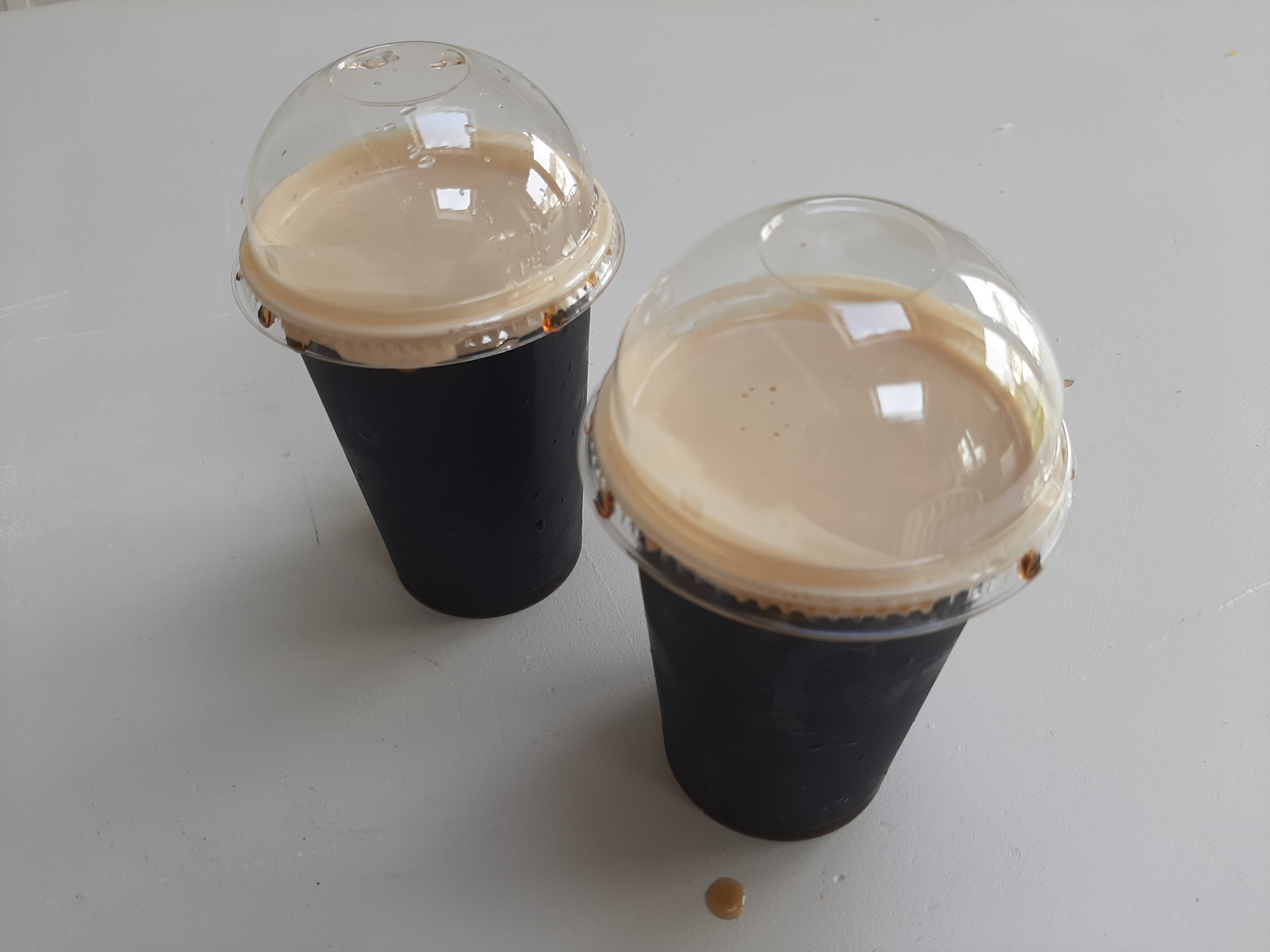
Two pints of stout delivered fresh from a pub. The delivery service of pints was a novel innovation of the pandemic in Ireland. The Garda Síochána—upon taking legal advice—confirmed that there was no law against the service.

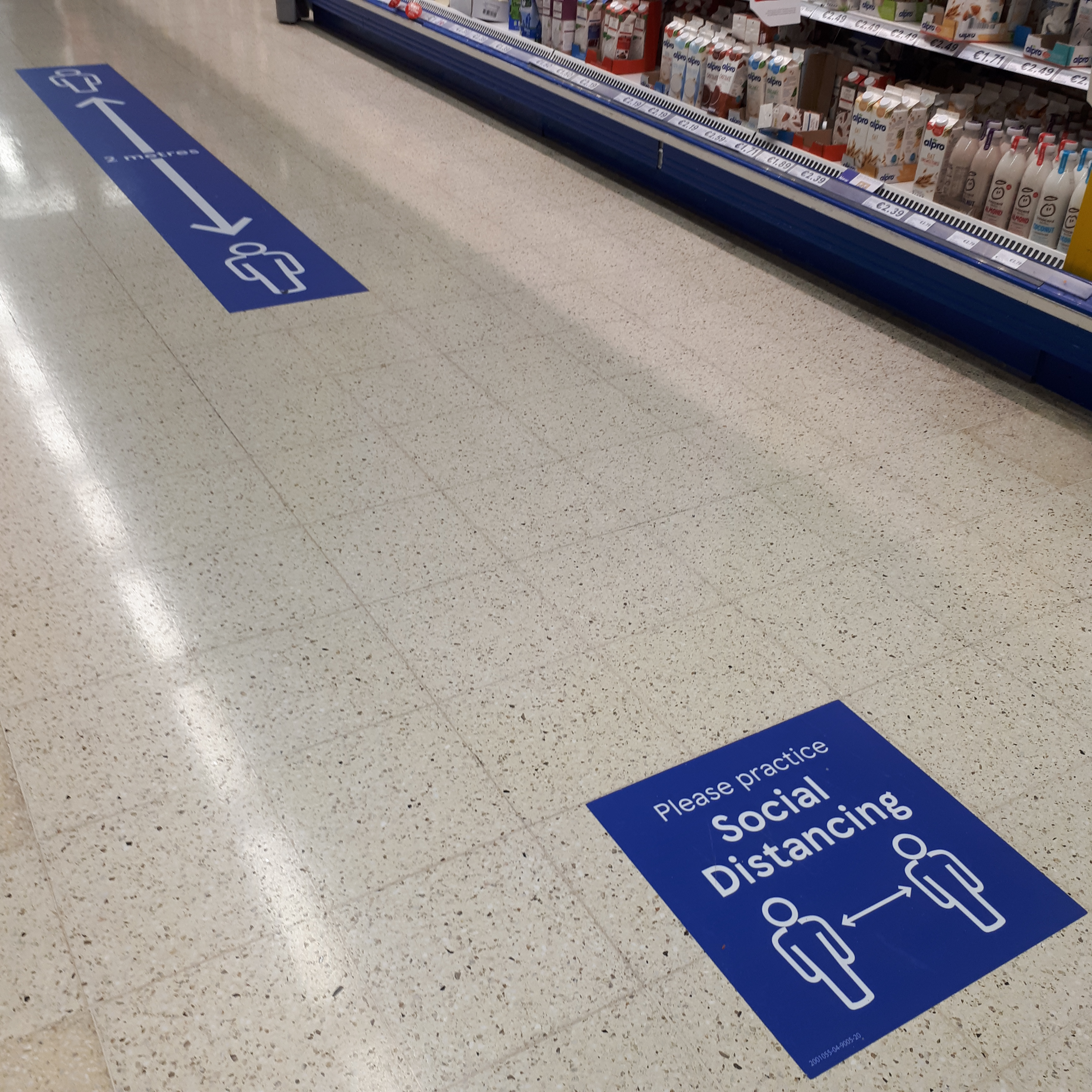
Social distancing floor signs in an Irish supermarket in August 2020.

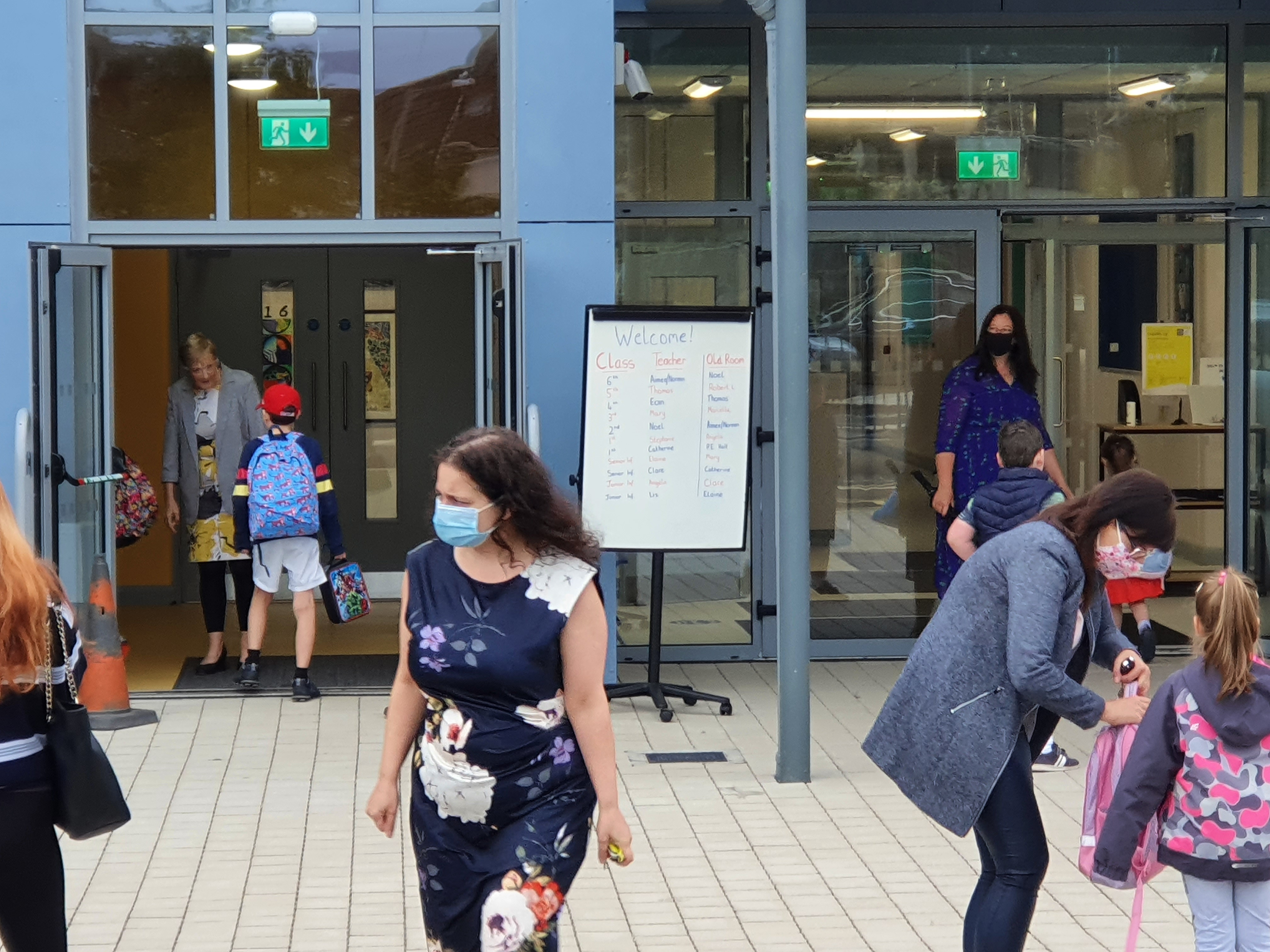
A principal and vice-principal greet returning students on the first day of school, September 2020.

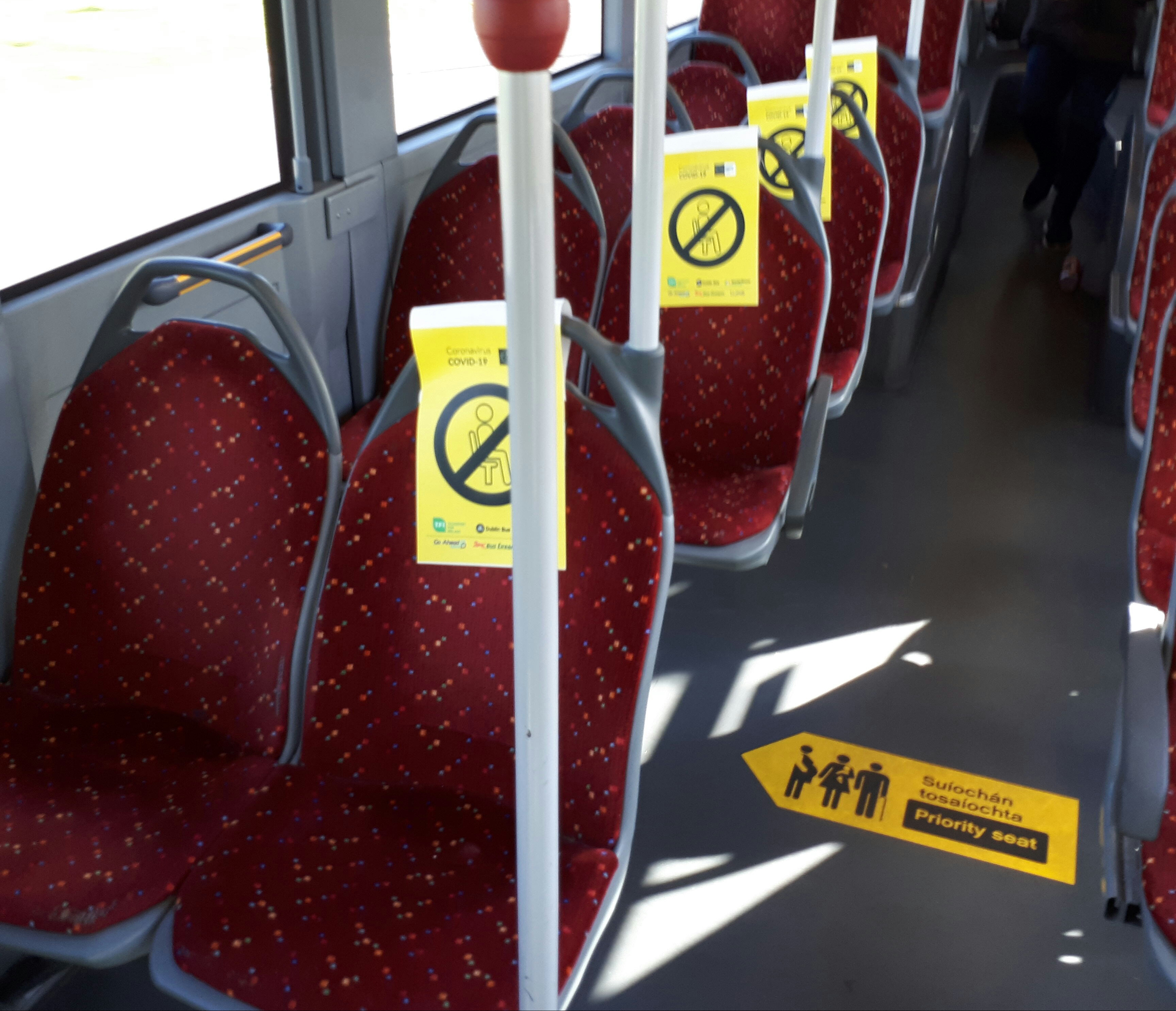
Bus Éireann social distancing signs on a bus in October 2020.

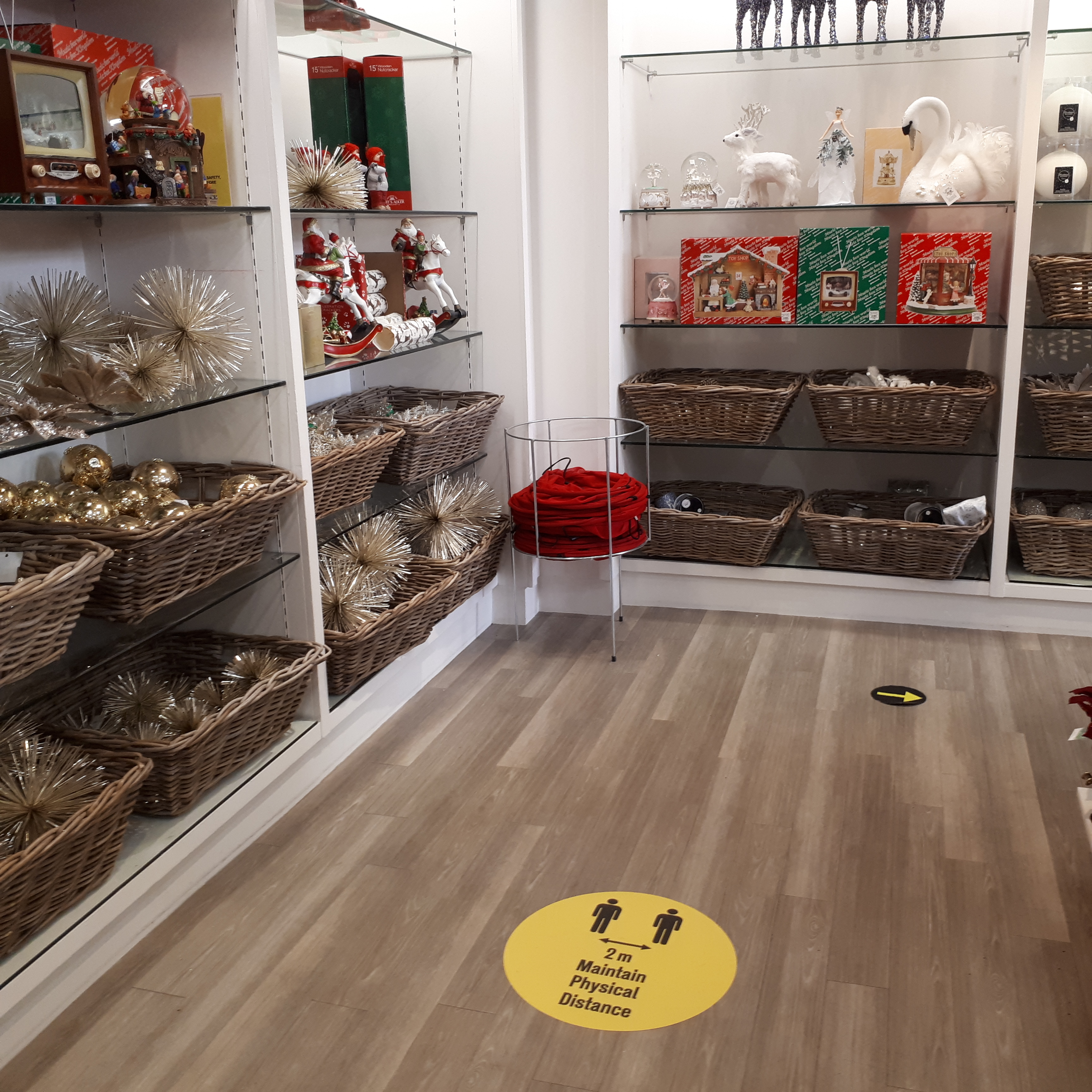
Floor physical distancing sign in an Irish store, amidst Christmas merchandise, in October 2020.

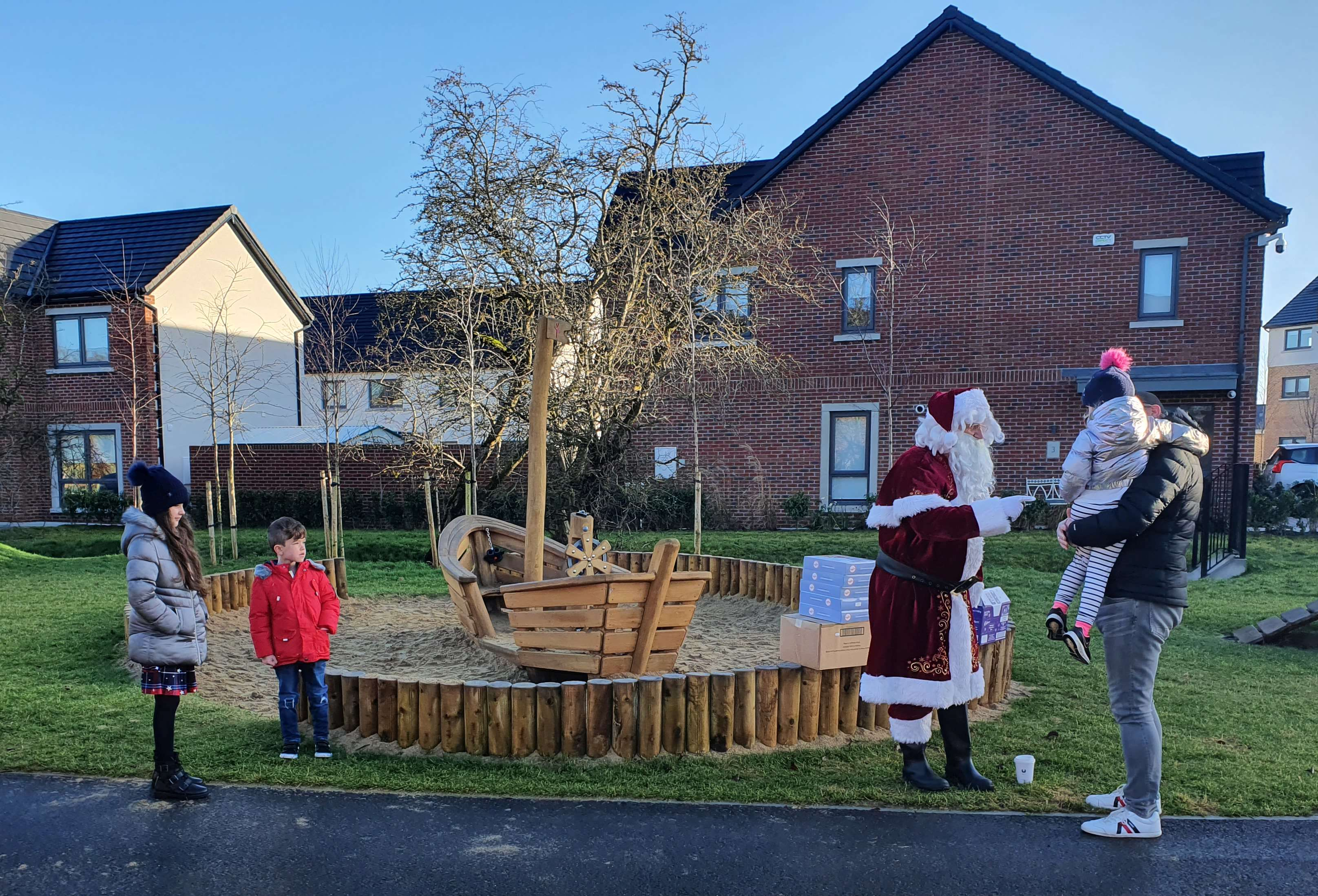
Santa conducts an outdoor visit to a housing estate in Maynooth, December 2020.

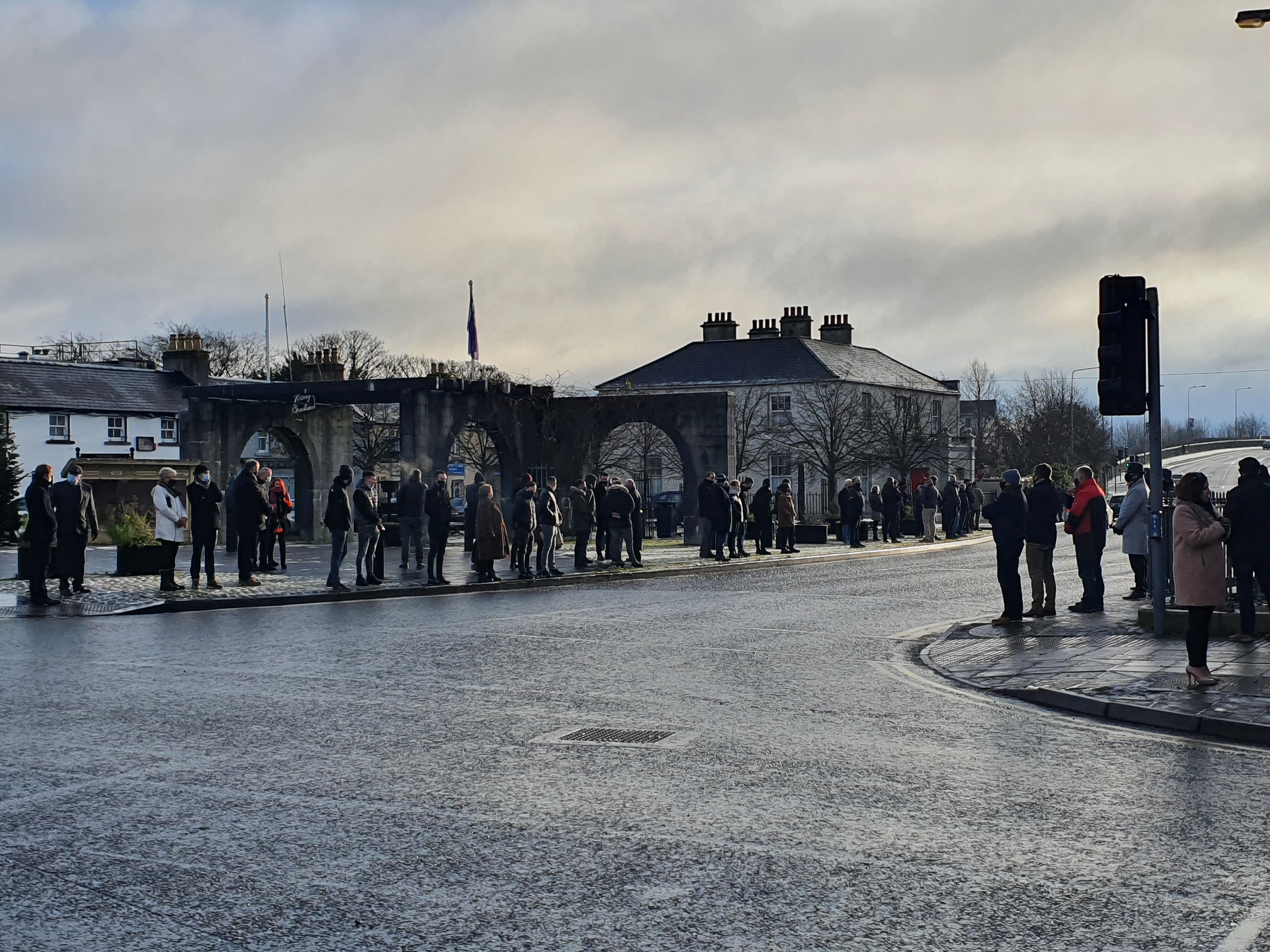
Prevented from attending a funeral, mourners line the main street of Maynooth to pay their respects to the departed, December 2020.

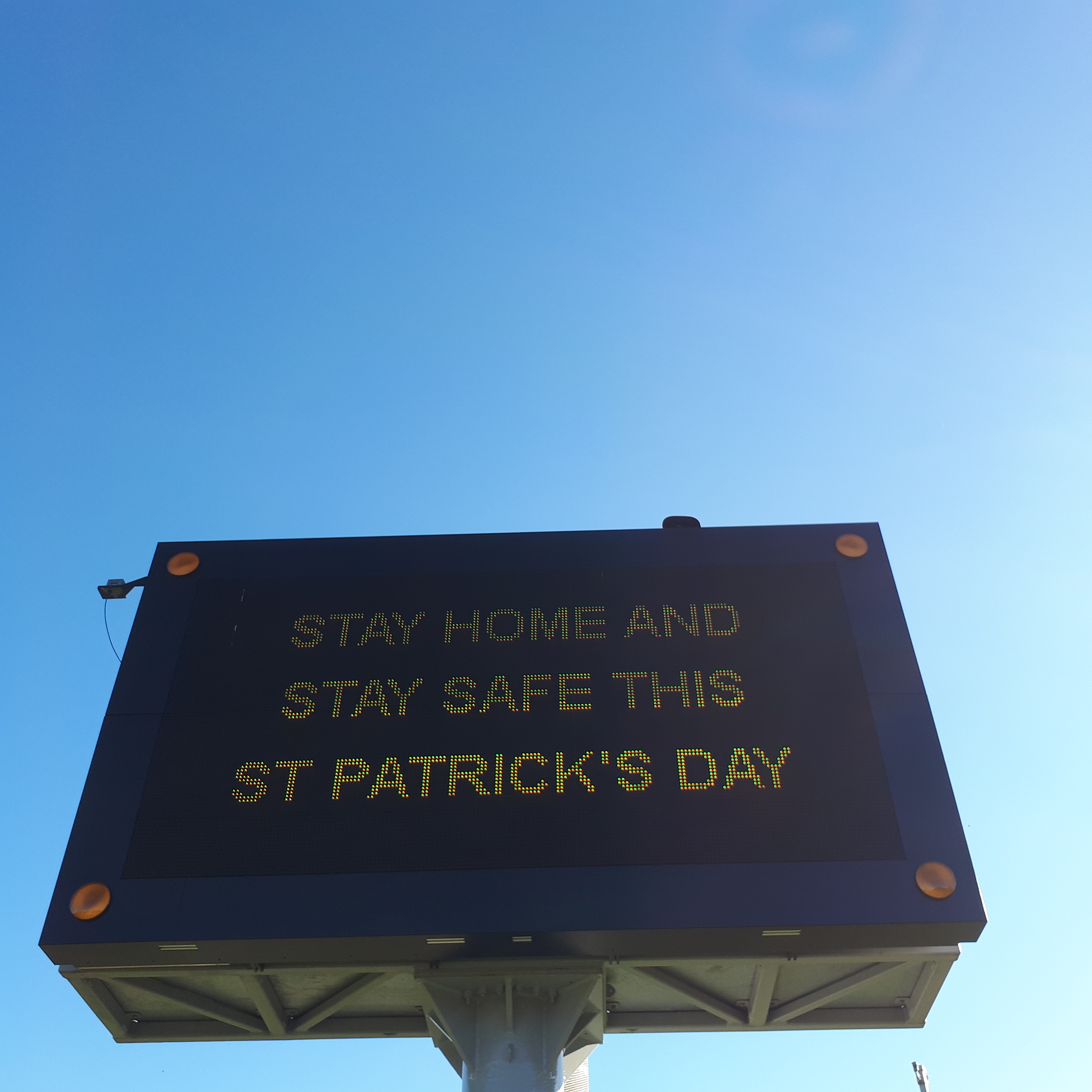
Electronic traffic sign, ahead of Saint Patrick's Day 2021, urging people to stay at home during the COVID-19 lockdown.

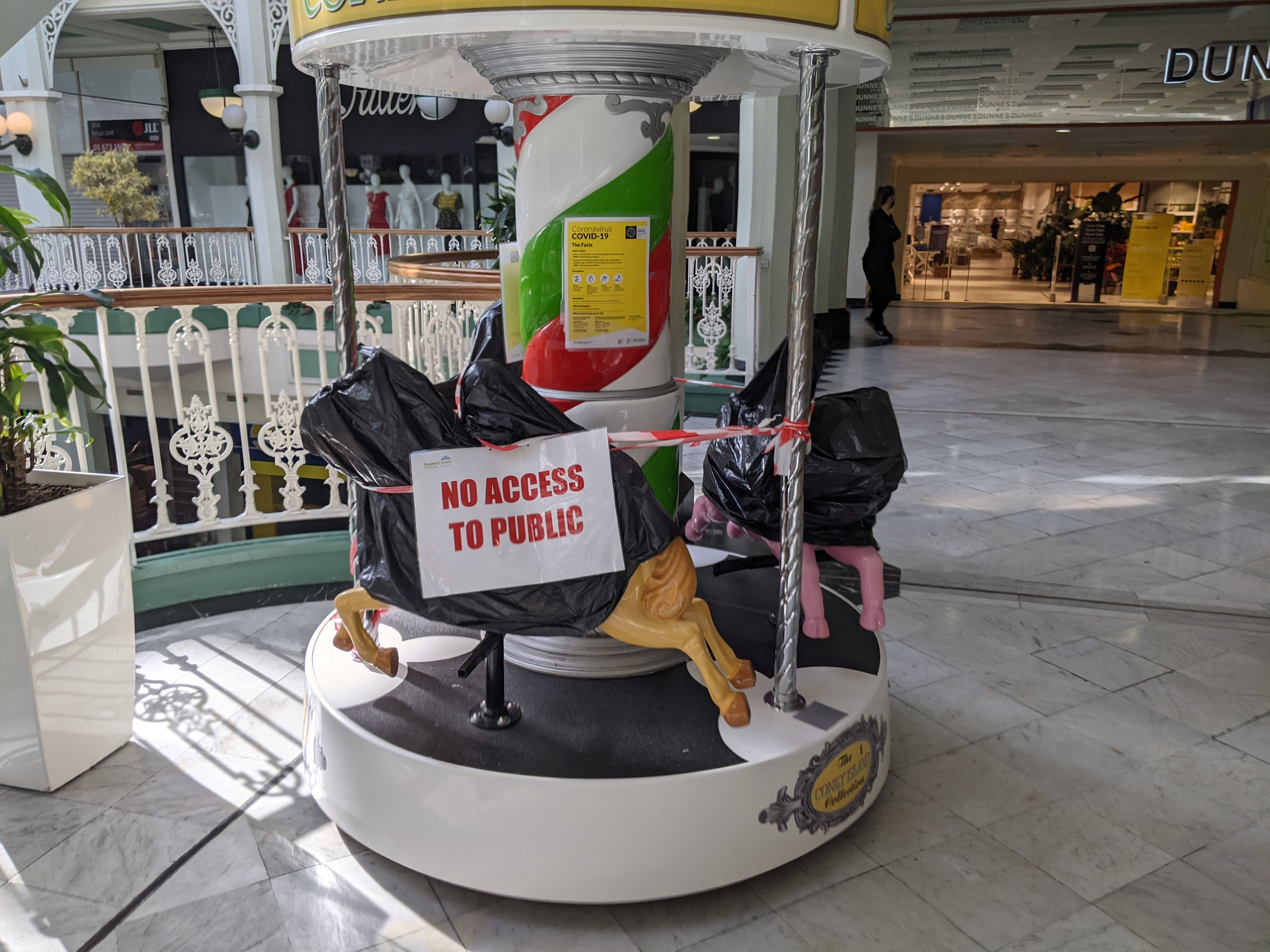
Children's merry-go-round in St Stephen's Green Shopping Centre, Dublin.

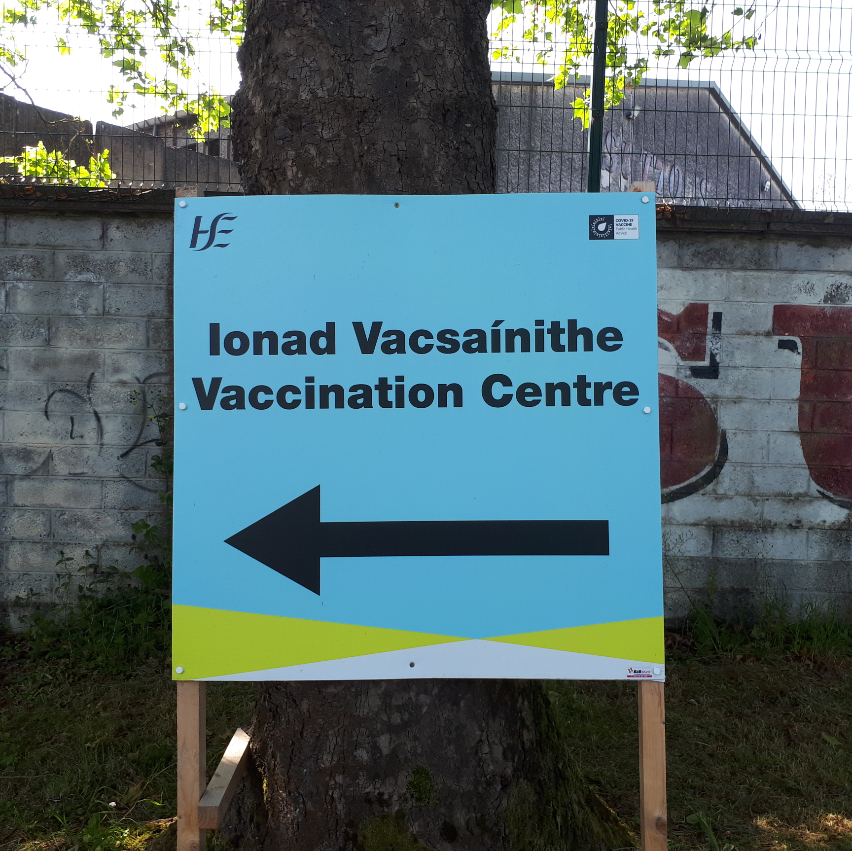
COVID-19 vaccination centre road sign in June 2021.

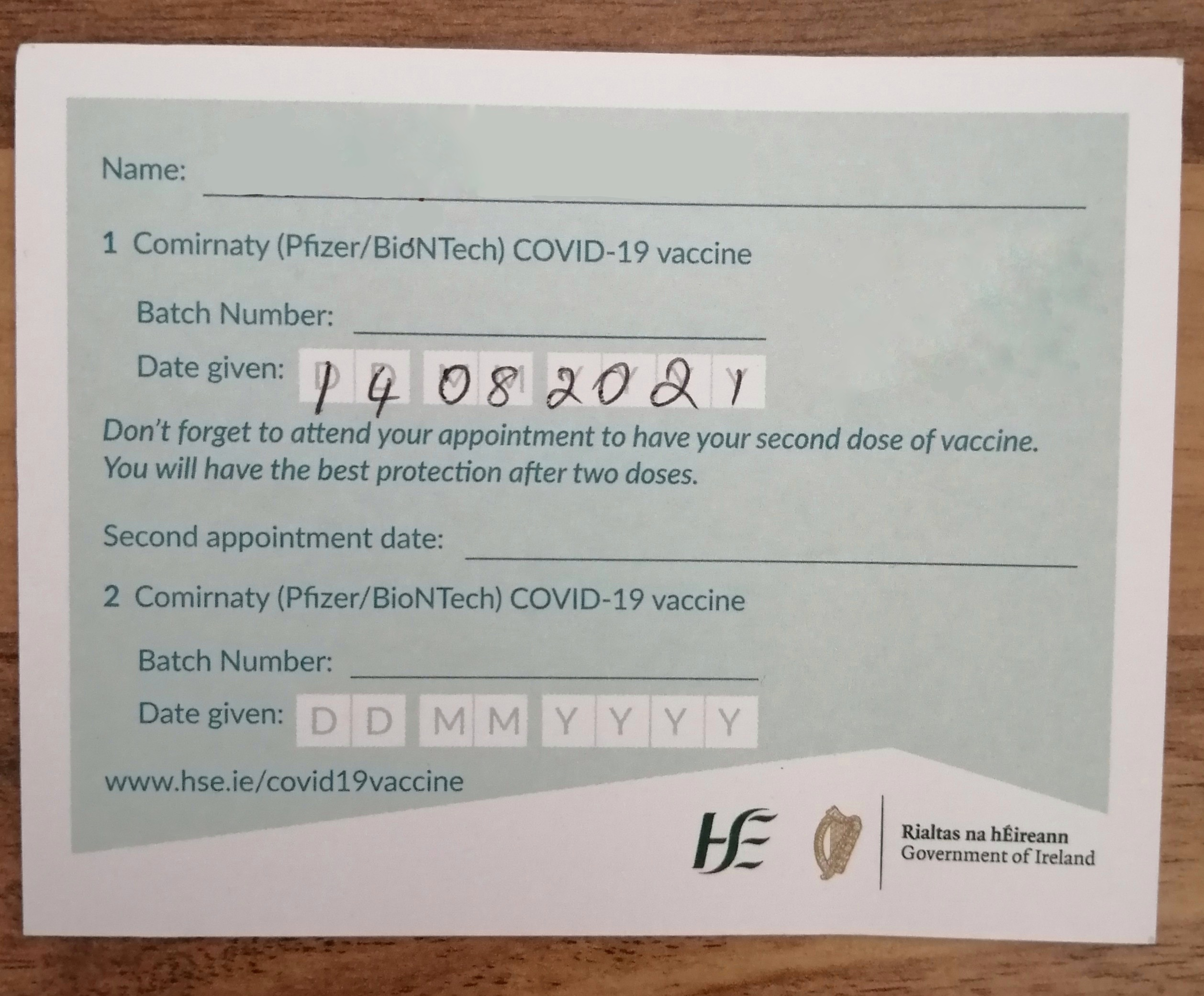
A COVID-19 Vaccination Record Card issued by the Health Service Executive (HSE) in August 2021.

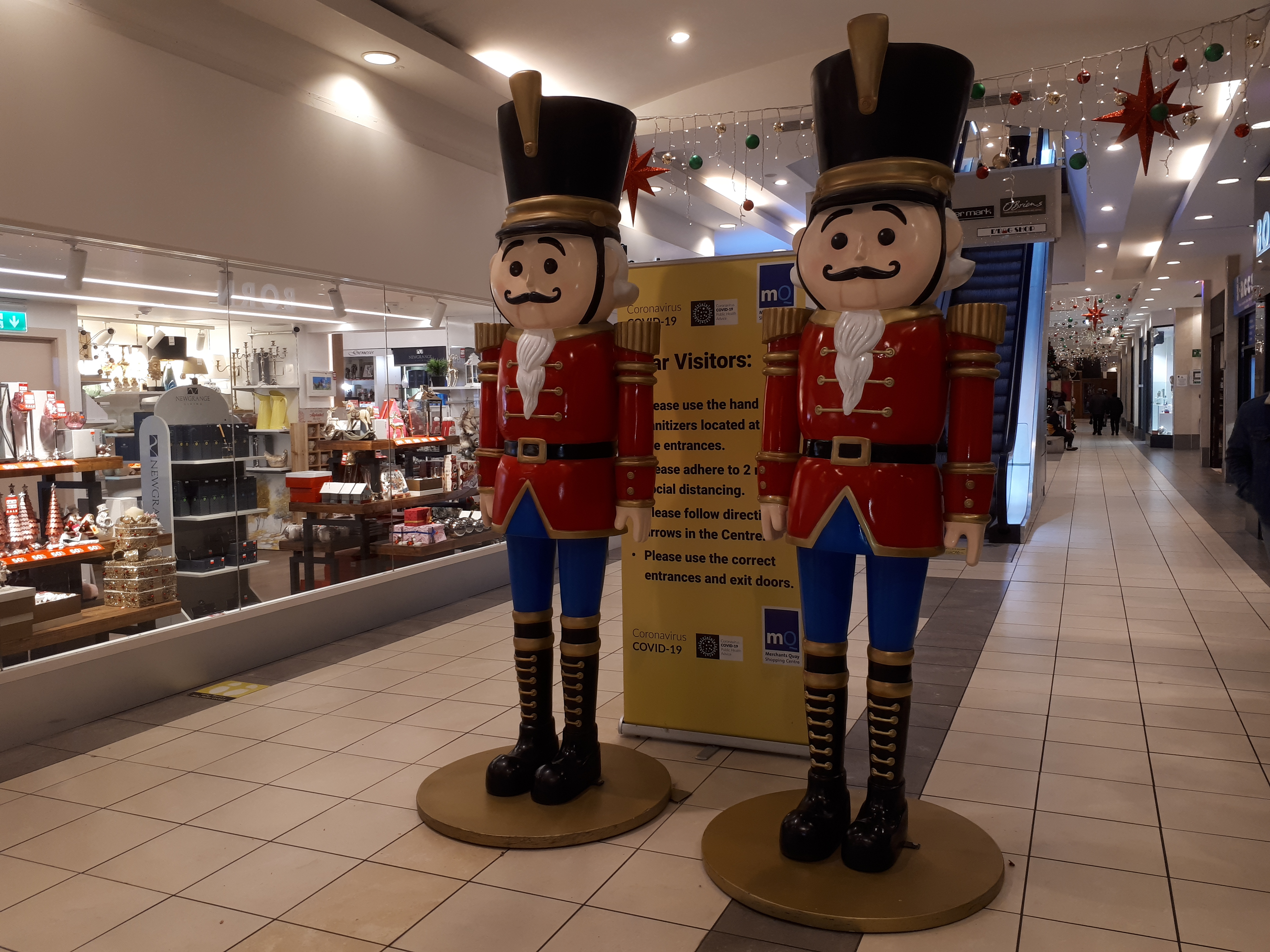
Mall sign on New Year's Eve, 31 December 2021, indicating the need for continued hand hygiene, social distancing and making use of one flow system.

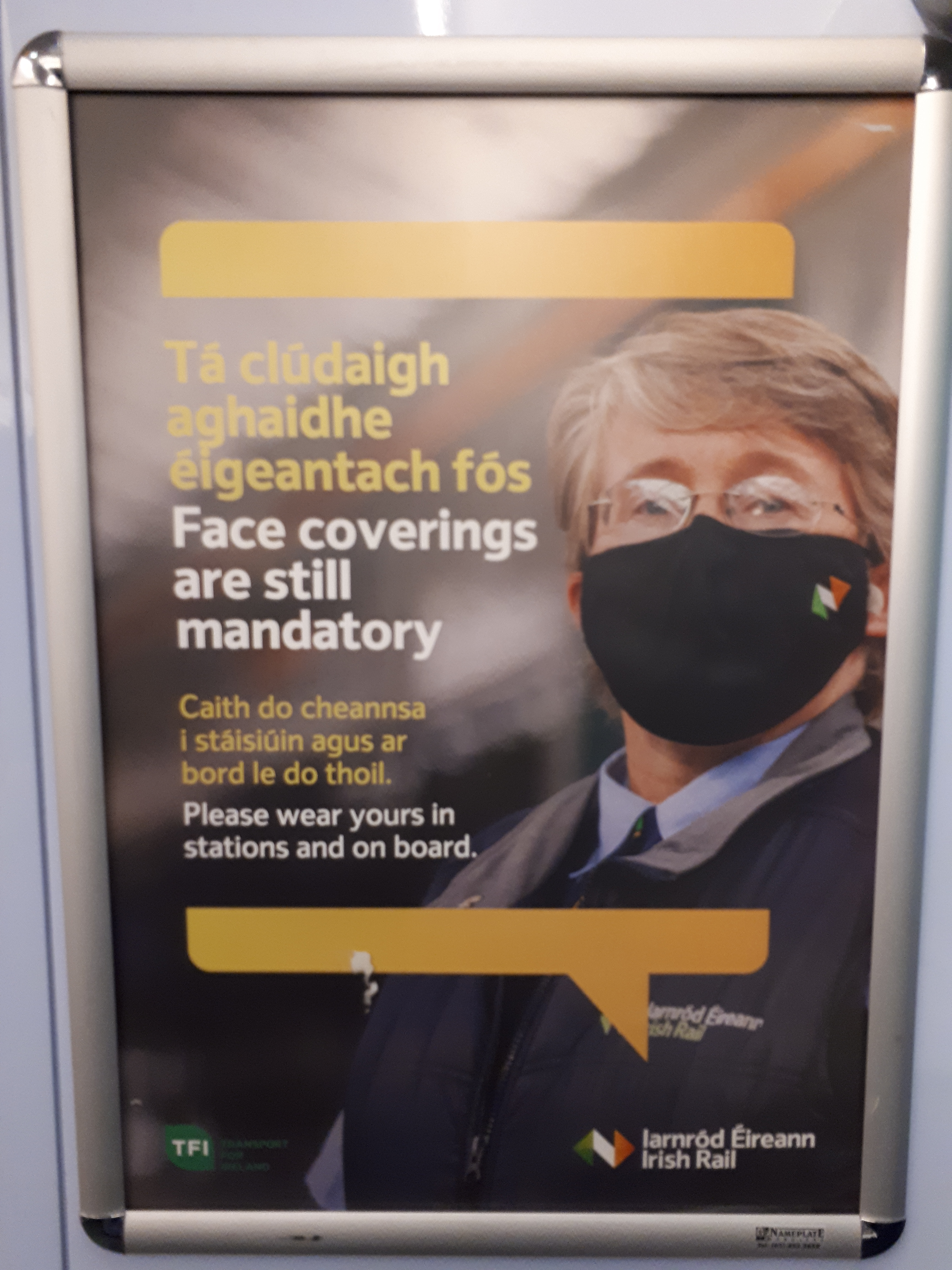
Iarnród Éireann face coverings sign on a train in January 2022.

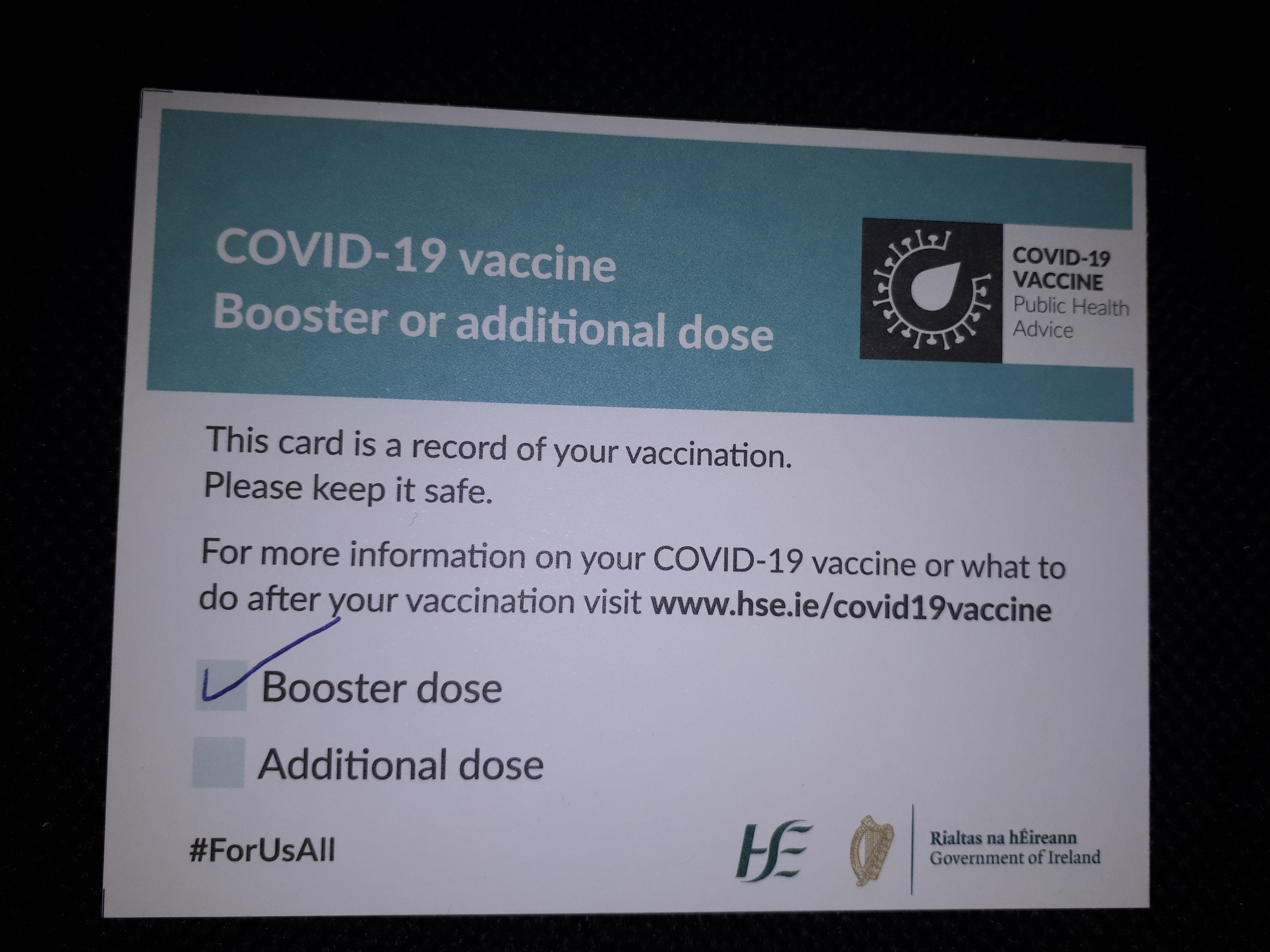
A COVID-19 Vaccine Booster Record Card issued by the Health Service Executive (HSE) in January 2022.

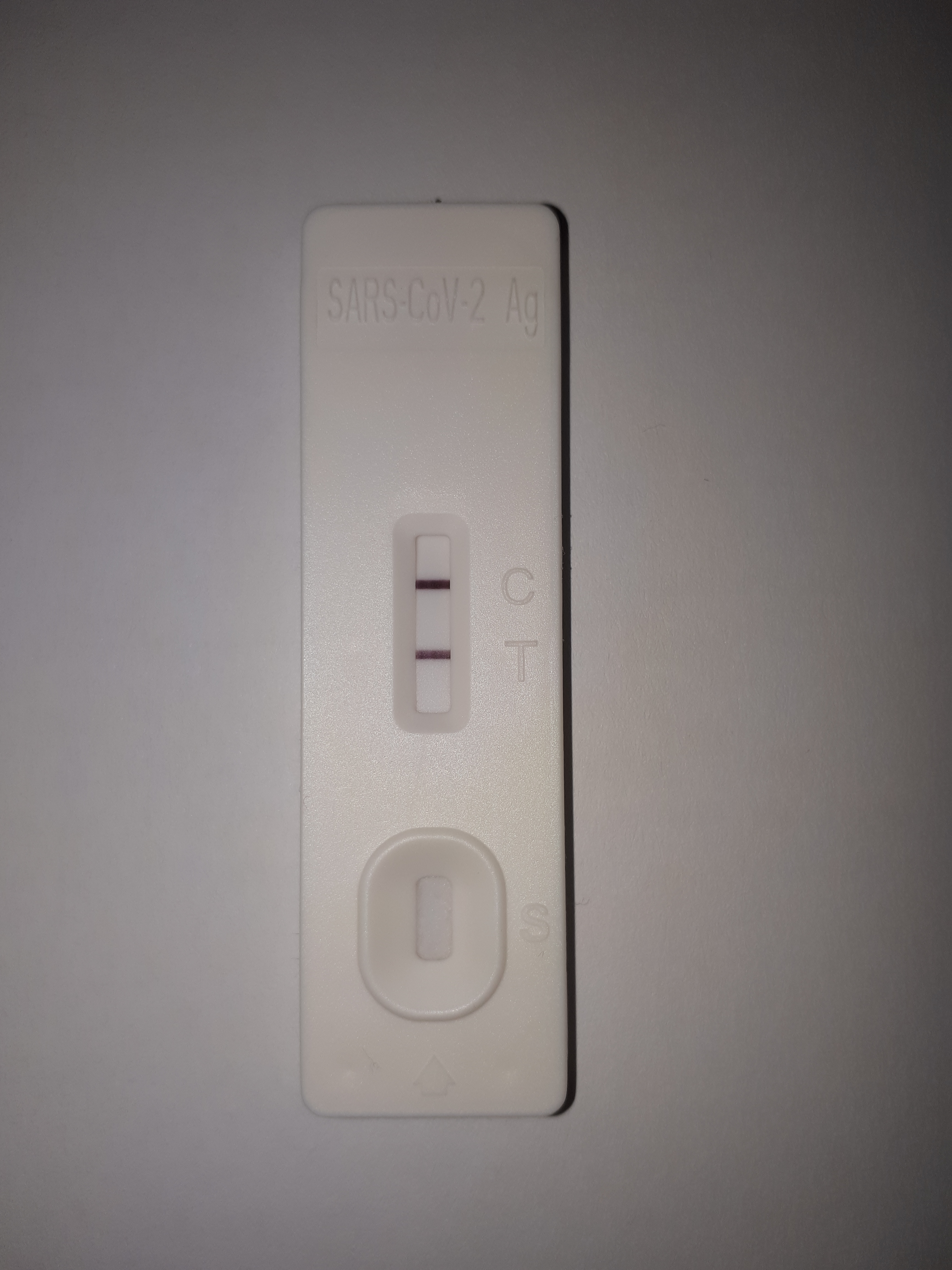
Positive COVID-19 rapid antigen test during the Republic of Ireland's fifth wave in April 2022.

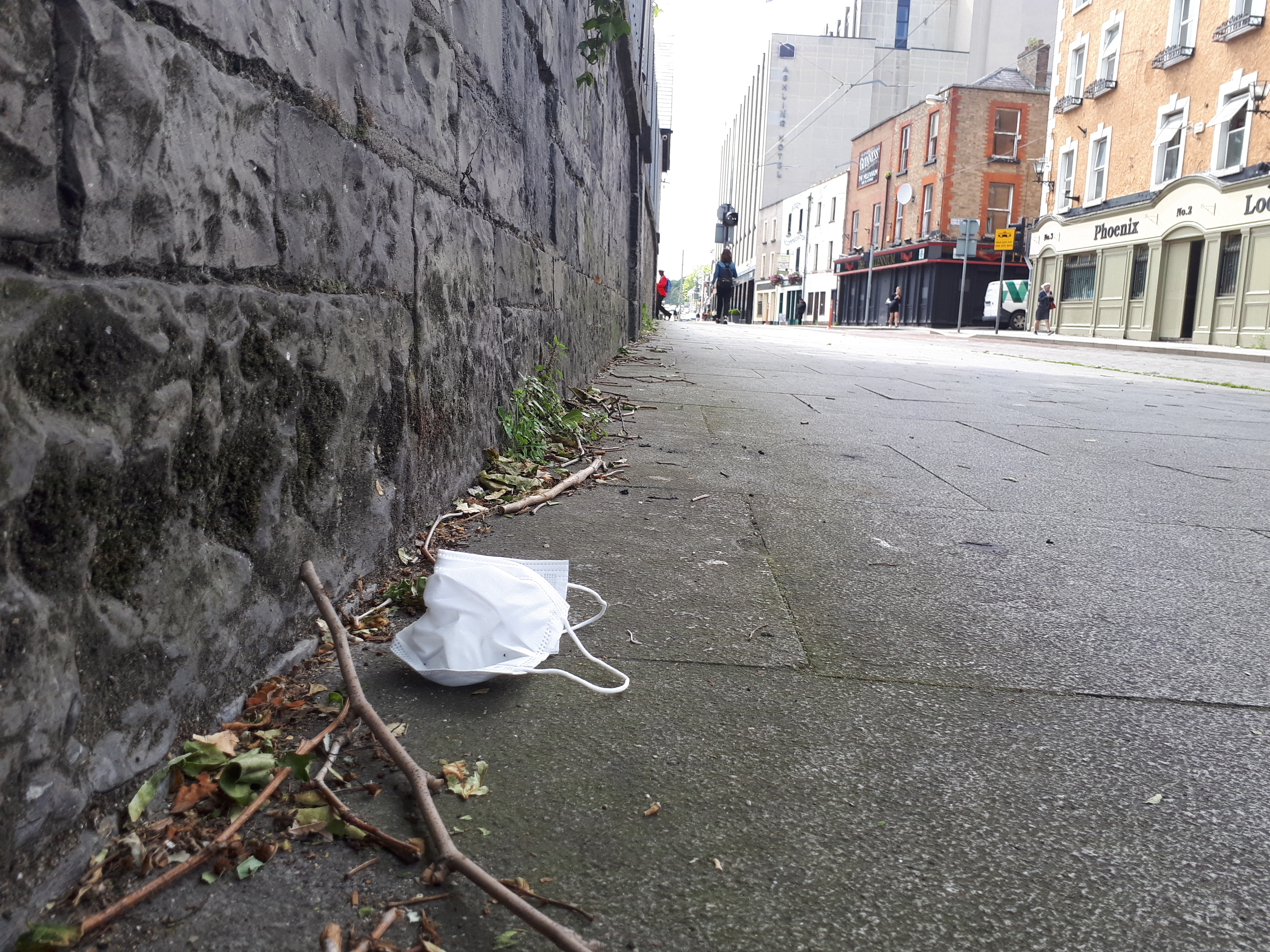
A discarded facemask on a Dublin street in June 2022.

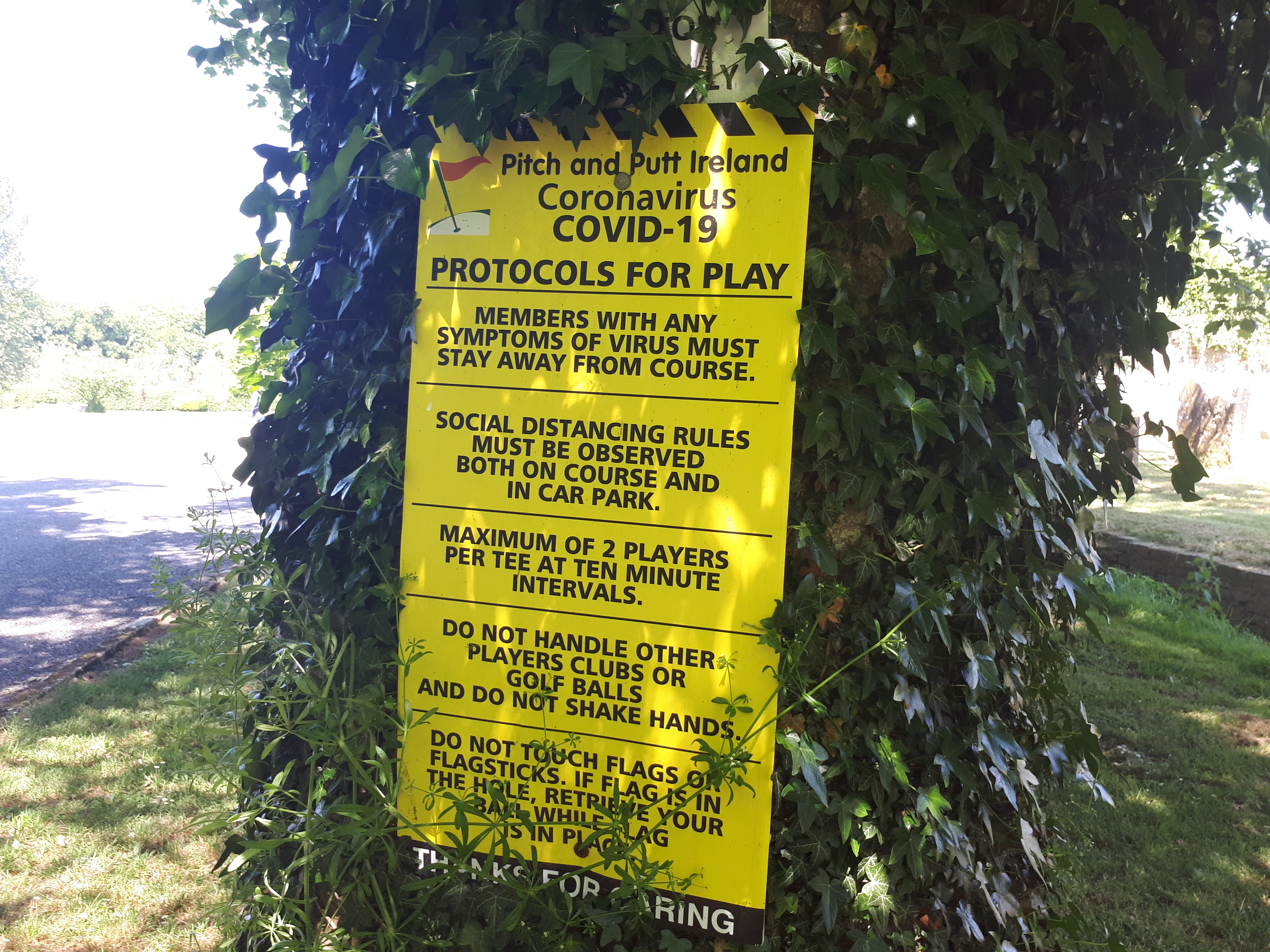
This public sign at a Pitch and putt venue, in June 2023, approximately 3 years and 3 months since the virus first made its official arrival in the country.

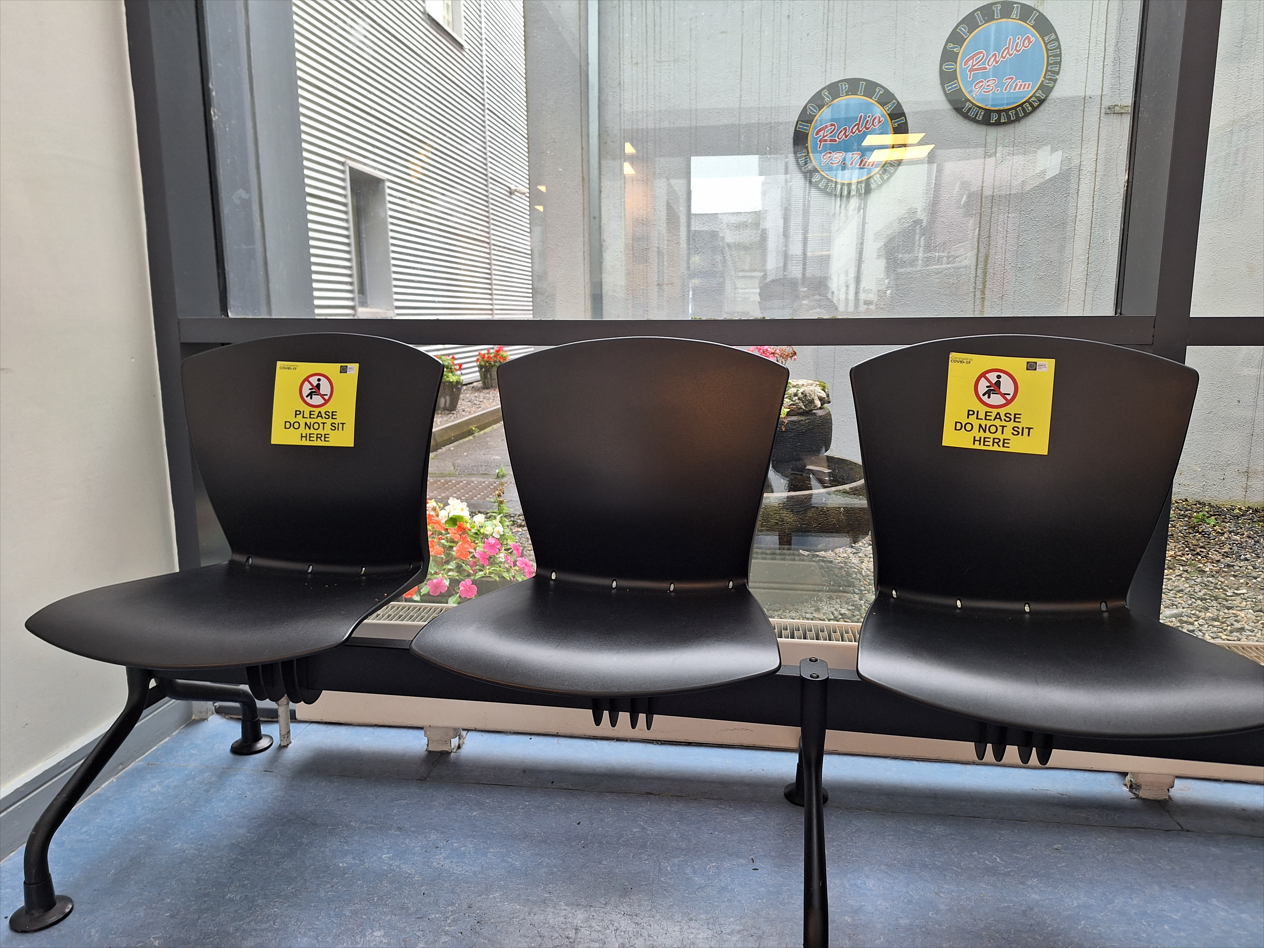
Public hospital physical distancing signs in Ireland in July 2023.

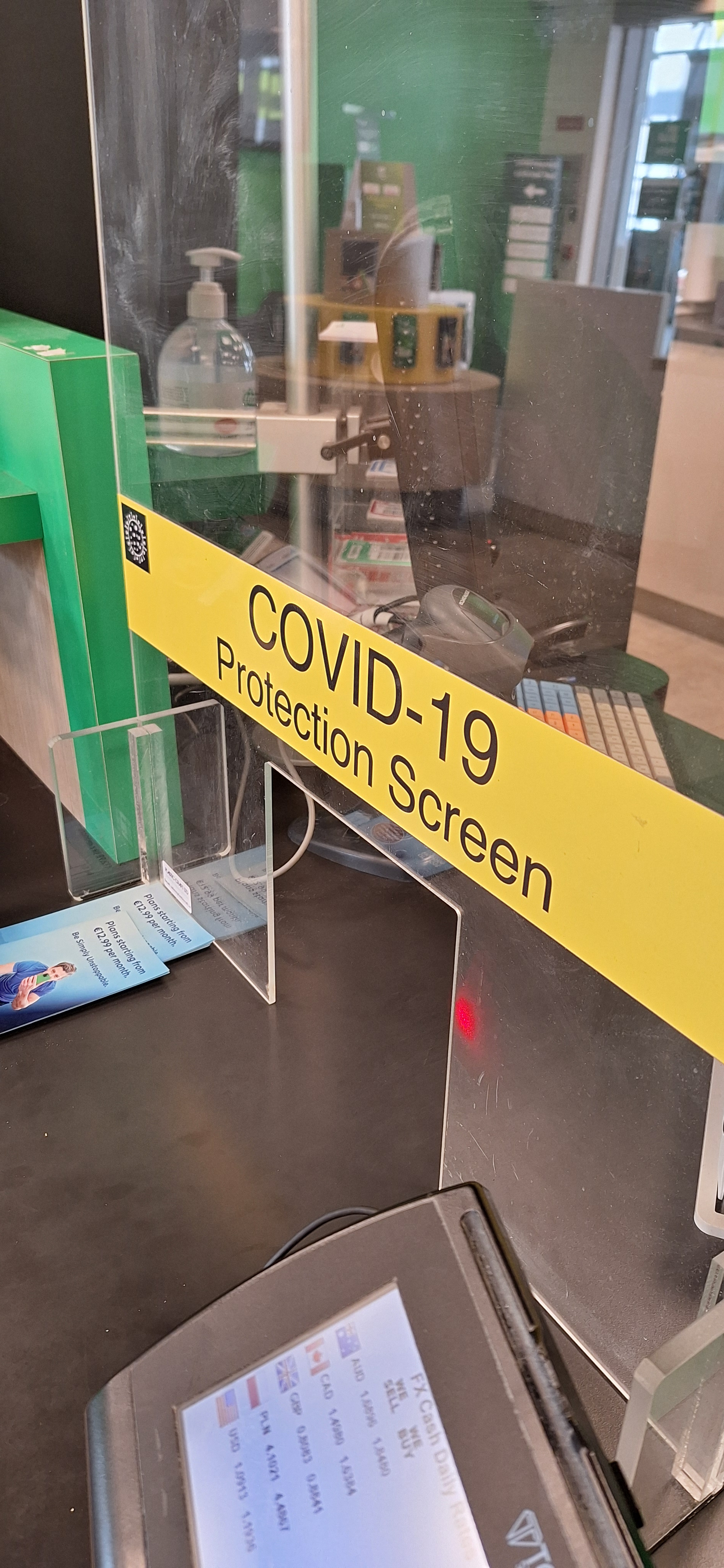
COVID-19 Protection Screen in An Post - July 2025.

== See also ==
- 2020 in Ireland
- 2021 in Ireland
- 2022 in Ireland
- COVID-19 pandemic in Northern Ireland
- Michael Ryan, Irish epidemiologist and executive director of the World Health Organization's Health Emergencies Programme
