= 2021 in Ireland =

- Centuries: 19th; 20th; 21st
- Decades: 2000s; 2010s; 2020s
- See also: 2021 in Northern Ireland; Other events of 2021; List of years in Ireland

Events during the year 2021 in Ireland. As in most of the world, the COVID-19 pandemic dominated events in Ireland this year.

== Incumbents ==
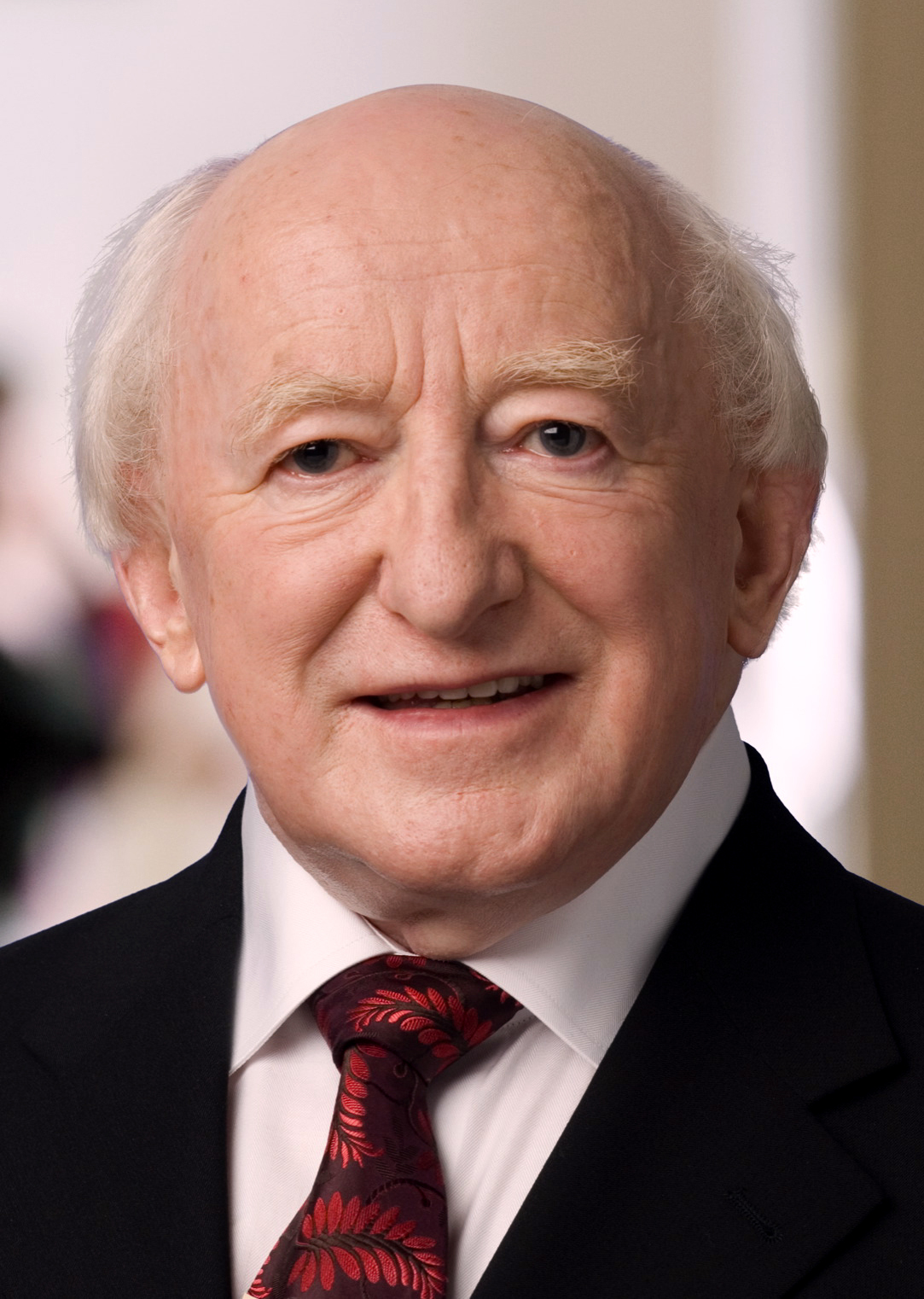
President Michael D. Higgins

- President: Michael D. Higgins
- Taoiseach: Micheál Martin (FF)
- Tánaiste: Leo Varadkar (FG)
- Minister for Finance: Paschal Donohoe (FG)
- Chief Justice:
  - Frank Clarke (until 10 October 2021)
  - Donal O'Donnell (since 11 October 2021)
- Dáil: 33rd
- Seanad: 26th

== Events ==
=== January ===
- 1 January
  - Munster Technological University officially opened as Ireland's newest and second technological university, and was described by Higher Education Minister Simon Harris as an "important milestone".
  - Minister for Children Roderic O'Gorman announced that the resumption of pre-school programmes would be delayed until 11 January, in line with the reopening of primary and secondary schools.
- 2 January
  - 3,394 cases of COVID-19 were confirmed in Ireland.
  - The Director of the National Virus Reference Laboratory Cillian de Gascun announced that a further nine cases of the UK variant of COVID-19 had been detected in Ireland from 23 December to 29 December, bringing the total number of cases identified to 16.
  - It was revealed that there were approximately 9,000 positive COVID-19 tests not yet logged on the Health Service Executive's IT systems, due to both limitations in the software; and lack of staff to check and input details, meaning there was an effective ceiling of approximately 1,700 to 2,000 cases that could be logged each day.
- 3 January – 4,962 cases of COVID-19 were confirmed.
- 4 January – 6,110 cases of COVID-19 were confirmed.
- 5 January
  - A 95-year-old woman became the first nursing home resident in Ireland to receive the Pfizer/BioNTech COVID-19 vaccine.
  - An infectious diseases consultant became the first healthcare worker in the Mater University Hospital to receive the COVID-19 vaccine.
  - The taoiseach, Micheál Martin, announced that up to 135,000 people would be vaccinated nationwide by the end of February 2021.
- 6 January
  - 7,836 cases of COVID-19 were confirmed.
  - The Government agreed a number of new lockdown measures including the closure of all schools until February with Leaving Certificate students allowed to attend school for three days a week, the closure of all non-essential construction sites with certain exceptions at 6 pm on 8 January, the requirement from 9 January for all passengers from the United Kingdom and South Africa to have a negative PCR test that they acquired within 72 hours of travelling and the prohibition of click-and-collect services for non-essential retail.
  - The tánaiste, Leo Varadkar, announced that the Moderna COVID-19 vaccine would allow 10,000 more people in Ireland to be vaccinated per week.
  - It was announced that the minister for justice Helen McEntee tested positive for COVID-19.
- 7 January
  - NPHET confirmed that the backlog of cases due to a delay in reporting positive laboratory results have been cleared.
  - The Government was forced to abandon plans for Leaving Certificate students to attend school on three days a week, and instead students will return to homeschooling along with other students until February, after the Association of Secondary Teachers, Ireland (ASTI) directed its members not to return to in-school teaching.
  - The distribution of the Pfizer/BioNTech COVID-19 vaccine in private and voluntary nursing homes began nationwide, with 22 nursing homes of 3,000 residents and staff to be vaccinated.
  - The tánaiste announced that the Government would consider banning the sale of alcohol after a certain time in a day, while all pubs, restaurants and other businesses were set to remain closed until April.
- 8 January
  - 8,248 cases of COVID-19 were confirmed – the highest number of confirmed cases recorded in a single day so far since the pandemic reached Ireland.
  - Chief Medical Officer Tony Holohan confirmed that three cases of the South African variant of COVID-19 had been detected in the Republic of Ireland by whole genome sequencing associated with travel from South Africa.
  - Met Éireann issued multiple Status Yellow low temperature and ice warnings as it was forecast to be extremely cold with temperatures plummeting to between –1 and –7 degrees Celsius.
- 9 January – A major fire that broke out at an animal feed storage facility near the Port of Cork was brought under control.
- 11 January
  - The purchase of alcohol with supermarket vouchers as well as a number of multi-buy schemes were banned under new legislation that came into effect.
  - Figures revealed by the Our World in Data organisation showed that Ireland had the highest daily number of new confirmed COVID-19 cases in the world for every million people.
  - Gardaí (police) received new COVID-19 enforcement powers, including the power to fine people €100 in breach in the 5 km travel limit.
- 12 January
  - The Mother and Baby Homes Commission of Investigation published its final report. The 3,000-page document stated that approximately 9,000 children died in Mother and Baby Homes between 1925 and 1998.
  - The Government agreed that all passengers arriving into Ireland would need a negative PCR COVID-19 test taken 72 hours before departure from Saturday 16 January.
  - The first shipment of the Moderna COVID-19 vaccine arrived in Ireland.
  - The Fine Gael parliamentary party agreed to readmit three senators who attended an Oireachtas Golf Society dinner in Clifden in August 2020.
  - The Irish Prison Service announced that three prisoners in Portlaoise and Mountjoy Prisons tested positive for COVID-19.
- 13 January
  - The taoiseach, Micheál Martin, issued a formal apology to victims and survivors of Mother and Baby Homes, on behalf of the state, and promised that the apology would be followed by actions, including access to counselling and records, provision of medical cards, and a system of reparations.
  - The Irish Nurses and Midwives Organisation (INMO) called for the Government to declare a national emergency and for all private hospital capacity to be fully nationalised into the public healthcare system as the number of hospitalisations doubled the peak of April 2020.
- 14 January
  - Gardaí issued 29 fines to people breaching the 5 km travel limit over the previous seven days including three people who travelled 80 km to "collect burgers from a takeaway" in Ringsend, Dublin.
  - The National Transport Authority announced that reduced timetables for bus operators in Dublin would recommence from Monday 18 January and would run at 80 percent capacity.
  - The Fianna Fáil parliamentary party agreed to readmit three senators who attended an Oireachtas Golf Society dinnerin Clifden in August 2020.
- 15 January – The Chief Medical Officers of Ireland and Northern Ireland Tony Holohan and Michael McBride issued a joint statement urging everyone to stay at home.
- 16 January
  - Around 1,800 healthcare workers received the Moderna COVID-19 vaccine at three mass vaccination centres that opened in Dublin, Galway and Portlaoise.
  - The Department of Health announced the suspension of all nursing and midwifery student placements for two weeks due to the effect of the COVID-19 pandemic on staffing levels.
- 17 January
  - The Government requested early deliveries of the Oxford–AstraZeneca COVID-19 vaccine as discussions to secure early delivery of the vaccine got underway.
  - The Irish Nurses and Midwives Organisation called for further clarity on the decision to suspend nursery and midwifery student placements for two weeks.
- 18 January – The number of patients with COVID-19 being treated in hospitals around the country reached a record 2,023, with 200 in intensive care units and over 400 people receiving high-grade ventilation and respiratory support.
- 19 January
  - Ninety three deaths of COVID-19 were confirmed.
  - The Government was forced to abandon plans to reopen special schools on Thursday 21 January for thousands of children with special educational needs following safety concerns among staff unions.
- 20 January
  - The Saint Patrick's Day parade in Dublin was cancelled for a second year.
  - Taoiseach Micheál Martin congratulated Joe Biden on his inauguration as the 46th President of the United States.
- 22 January
  - The taoiseach confirmed that there would be no easing of Level 5 lockdown restrictions at the end of January and suggested the current restrictions would be in place for at least another four weeks.
  - Gardaí issued 771 fines to people breaching the 5 km travel limit since 11 January with the majority issued in Wicklow, Cork, Laois and Longford, while 30 fines were issued for the non-wearing of face coverings in certain locations.
  - The Chief Clinical Officer of the Health Service Executive (HSE) Colm Henry stated that COVID-19 transmission levels remained too high for schools to reopen in February.
  - The HSE confirmed that 11 residents of a nursing home in North County Dublin died after testing positive for COVID-19.
  - A woman was arrested after the lord mayor of Dublin Hazel Chu was targeted by a group of anti-mask protestors for wearing a face mask outside the Mansion House, Dublin.
- 23 January
  - The taoiseach stated that COVID-19 vaccinations for people over the age of 70 may be delayed due to issues with the supply of the Oxford–AstraZeneca COVID-19 vaccine, and also stated that COVID-19 restrictions would be in place for at least the first six months of the year and that not all of the 1 million students nationwide will be back in school before Saint Patrick's Day.
  - Met Éireann issued a national Status Yellow snow and ice warning as falls of hail, sleet and snow with icy and hazardous conditions was forecast to take place.
- 24 January – A national Status Yellow snow and ice warning remained in place and a low-temperature and ice warning came into effect as it was forecast to be very cold overnight, with temperatures expected to drop as low as -5 degrees Celsius, while Gardaí urged caution on icy roads after the west and east of the country was hit by snow.
- 25 January
  - Gardaí warned that foreign holidays were not deemed essential as 1,500 fines were issued to people breaching the 5 km travel limit in the previous two weeks.
  - Minister for health Stephen Donnelly announced that community vaccination of people aged 70 and over would begin in mid-February.
  - A meat-processing plant in Bunclody, County Wexford confirmed 42 cases of COVID-19 following screening of all staff on 15 January.
  - The Garda Síochána, HSE, and the Department of Health warned the public to be aware of possible scam text messages and phone calls relating to the COVID-19 vaccine.
- 26 January
  - Ireland's COVID-19 death toll passed 3,000 after 90 more COVID-19-related deaths were reported, bringing the death toll since the beginning of the pandemic to 3,066.
  - Chief Medical Officer Tony Holohan confirmed that a further six cases of the South African variant of COVID-19 had been detected.
  - The government announced the extension of the Level 5 lockdown restrictions until 5 March, along with a number of new measures including a mandatory 14-day quarantine period for all people travelling into the country without a negative COVID-19 test, including all arrivals from Brazil and South Africa.
  - The government made the wearing of face coverings in all banks, credit unions and post offices mandatory.
  - Talks between the Department of Education and unions continued with hopes that schools would be able to reopen on a phased basis between February and March.
- 28 January
  - A man was arrested in connection with the murder of 16-year-old Josh Dunne who was stabbed to death in Ballymun, Dublin on the night of 26 January.
  - Katie Taylor was named the RTÉ Sports Person of the Year 2020.
- 29 January
  - The taoisesch paid tribute to RTÉ's Tommie Gorman who was retiring from the organisation in April after 41 years.
  - Ireland was expected to receive 300,000 fewer doses of the Oxford–AstraZeneca COVID-19 vaccine by the end of March as a result of a shortfall in deliveries to the European Union.
  - Gardaí issued more than 2,400 fines to people breaching the 5 km travel limit in the previous two weeks, including a man who travelled 200 km to "collect a puppy as a gift" in Cork.
- 30 January
  - Met Éireann issued a Status Yellow snow and ice warning for 18 counties with temperatures forecast to drop to below freezing overnight.
  - The chief medical officer, Tony Holohan, announced that more cases had been confirmed in one month than throughout 2020 with over 1,000 deaths and more than 100,000 cases confirmed in January.
  - The Director of the National Virus Reference Laboratory Cillian de Gascun stated that there was no significant transmission of the South African COVID-19 variant in Ireland as cases of the variant identified had been contained.

=== February ===
- 1 February
  - The Department of Education agreed to reopen special schools with 50 percent capacity on Thursday 11 February and special classes in mainstream schools on Monday 22 February.
  - Europol warned travellers to watch for organised crime gangs selling fake negative COVID-19 certificates at airports.
  - Latest figures showed that in the last four days of January, Gardaí fined 280 people at Dublin Airport for leaving the country for non-essential travel, while more than 3,500 fines had been issued in total for breaches of COVID-19 regulations, with 2,100 fines for travelling without a reasonable excuse.
  - A nursing home in Tuam, County Galway appealed for help from qualified nurses following the deaths of 12 residents due to COVID-19.
  - It was announced that more than 30 residents of four Cork nursing homes and a community hospital in County Kerry died in the previous two weeks following COVID-19 outbreaks.
- 2 February
  - 101 deaths of COVID-19 were confirmed in Ireland – the highest number of confirmed deaths recorded in a single day so far since the pandemic reached Ireland.
  - Figures showed a total of 1,543 staff and residents in nursing homes died during the pandemic with 369 in January alone.
  - Over 2,000 students who sat the postponed written Leaving Certificate exams in November 2020 received their results, with over 40 percent of the grades higher than the calculated grades students had received.
- 3 February
  - The Irish astronomer Kenneth Edgeworth (1880–1972) was honoured by the International Astronomical Union when the crater Edgeworth was named after him on the minor planet Pluto.
  - Another outbreak of COVID-19 at a direct provision centre in Newbridge, County Kildare was confirmed.
  - The Health Service Executive expressed concern over increases in COVID-19 transmission linked to social gatherings involving the student population in the mid-west region.
- 4 February
  - The total number of COVID-19 cases in Ireland surpassed 200,000 cases, with over half confirmed in 2021.
  - The minister for health Stephen Donnelly signed new regulations that empower Gardaí to call to the homes of people who arrive from international travel and ensure that they are abiding by mandatory quarantine rules, with a €2,500 fine or an imprisonment sentence of six months for non-compliance.
  - Gardaí began an investigation after a woman's body was discovered in a burning car in North Cork.
- 5 February
  - Widespread disruptions were predicted for the weekend, with heavy snow expected to fall across the country from Wednesday 10 February, as the Beast from the East was set to return.
  - It was announced that Ireland's first ever dedicated wildlife hospital would open in two weeks' time in County Meath.
  - Gardaí issued more than 375 fines to people breaching the 5 km travel limit over the previous seven days, bringing the total number of breaches to over 4,600.
  - The minister for health announced that the first batches of 21,600 doses of the AstraZeneca COVID-19 vaccine would arrive in the weekend, with 190,000 doses expected to arrive by the end of February.
  - The minister for education Norma Foley announced a new phase of planning for the Leaving Certificate examinations.
  - A man in his 60s was arrested in connection with the death of 72-year-old Mary O'Keeffe whose body was discovered in a burning car in north Cork.
- 6 February – The first shipment of 21,600 AstraZeneca COVID-19 vaccines arrived in Ireland.
- 7 February – A 62-year-old man was charged with the murder of 72-year-old Mary O'Keeffe whose body was found in a burning car near the village of Doneraile in north Cork on 4 February.
- 8 February
  - The minister for housing Darragh O'Brien confirmed that the government was working to reopen the construction sector on 5 March.
  - People living in Northern Ireland who cross the border without a reasonable excuse face a €100 fine from today.
  - Gardaí investigated whether a couple found dead at their house in County Cavan may have died as a result of accidental poisoning.
  - Met Éireann issued a Status Yellow snow and ice warning for six eastern counties as up to 5 cm of snow was expected over the next 24 hours.
- 9 February
  - The Government announced funding of €160 million in additional supports for businesses affected by COVID-19.
  - The tánaiste Leo Varadkar announced that the government is working on a revised version of the "Living with COVID-19" plan which he hoped would be announced in the week of 22 February.
  - Figures released by the National Public Health Emergency Team showed that more than one in three deaths from COVID-19 in February reported were associated with outbreaks in nursing homes.
- 10 February
  - The taoiseach announced that fines for non-essential travel abroad would be increased from €500 to €2,000, after a request was made to the minister for health to approve the increase.
  - The minister for education and Minister of State for Special Education Josepha Madigan announced details of a return to in-school teaching and learning for students attending special classes in secondary schools from Monday 22 February, after a deal was agreed between teacher and SNA trade unions and the department of education.
  - The director of the National Virus Reference Laboratory Cillian de Gascun stated that the government should be vaccinated as soon as possible and that the taoiseach should receive his vaccine ahead of travel if he is to visit the United States for Saint Patrick's Day.
  - The World Health Organization praised Ireland's recovery from the third wave of COVID-19 but warned of the danger of a fourth wave.
  - The Gaelic Athletic Association announced that there would be no inter-county Gaelic games activity until Easter at the earliest.
- 11 February
  - The taoiseach stated that the majority of the current Level 5 lockdown restrictions were set to be extended until the Easter period, with only schools and the construction sector likely to be allowed to reopen before Easter.
  - Up to 4,000 children with additional educational needs returned to in-person education as special schools nationwide reopened their doors, under plans agreed between the department of education and teacher and SNA trade unions.
  - The ASTI withdrew from discussions with the department of education on the Leaving Certificate 2021 after it said that the plan being developed would not provide a "meaningful Leaving Certificate" for students.
  - Director-general of the HSE Paul Reid suggested that healthcare workers who refuse to take the COVID-19 vaccine may be removed from their frontline duties.
  - Status Yellow warnings for snow, ice and strong winds came into effect with sleet and snow expected to sweep across the country.
- 12 February
  - The department of health added a further 18 countries to the Government's COVID-19 "high-risk" list for international travel.
  - The chair of the NPHET Irish Epidemiological Modelling Advisory Group Philip Nolan stated that it would be at least six weeks before COVID-19 cases drop to around 100 a day and that the country should be at around 200–400 cases a day heading into March and approaching 100–200 cases a day by the end of March.
  - Gardaí issued more than 6,500 fines to people breaching COVID-19 regulations over the past month, with over 4,900 fines issued for non-essential travel.
  - It was confirmed that the traditional Saint Patrick's Day meeting between US President Joe Biden and Taoiseach Micheál Martin at the White House would take place virtually due to the COVID-19 pandemic.
  - Two men were arrested after Gardaí seized €7.4 million worth of drugs in County Kildare on the night of 11 February.
  - Gardaí began a murder investigation after a 44-year-old man, Paddy Lyons, was shot dead in Ballymun on the night of 11 February.
- 13 February
  - The ASTI re-joined discussions with the department of education on the Leaving Certificate 2021 after pulling out on 11 February.
  - The pace of the COVID-19 vaccine rollout in Ireland is set to increase from Monday 15 February with the first doses administered to over-85s in the community and the first widespread use of the AstraZeneca vaccine.
  - Up to 8,000 people were left without power as stormy weather prevailed across the country.
  - Met Éireann issued a Status Orange wind warning for counties Donegal, Galway and Mayo with an additional Status Yellow wind warning for the rest of the country as more unsettled weather was forecast across the country.
- 15 February
  - The minister for health confirmed locations for 37 vaccination centres across all counties as part of the country's COVID-19 vaccination programme.
  - Vaccines officially began for the third cohort in Ireland's prioritisation list, with over 80,000 people expected to receive COVID vaccines.
  - No new deaths of COVID-19 was confirmed by the department of health.
  - It was announced that two universities in Galway and Limerick had been hit by major COVID-19 outbreaks of up to nearly 250 confirmed cases due to students breaching Level 5 lockdown regulations, which caused clusters of infection involving up to 40 people.
- 17 February
  - Ireland's COVID-19 death toll surpassed 4,000 after 57 deaths were confirmed as Deputy Chief Medical Officer Ronan Glynn announced that 90% of COVID-19 cases in Ireland were the UK variant of COVID-19.
  - The minister for education confirmed that Leaving Certificate examinations would proceed with students given the option between a modified version of calculated grades or written exams, while Junior Certificate examinations were cancelled for a second year in a row.
  - Four people, including two politicians, were expected to face charges over alleged breaches of COVID-19 regulations during an Oireachtas Golf Society event in Clifden, County Galway in August 2020.
  - The Irish Prison Service announced that three prisoners in the Midlands Prison tested positive for COVID-19.
- 18 February
  - Gardaí seized more than €12 million worth of suspected cocaine at Ringaskiddy Port, Cork.
  - An Irishman, Richard O'Halloran, appealed to Chinese authorities to let him return to Ireland after being detained in China since 2019.
  - A 76-year-old retired school teacher, John McClean, who indecently and sexually abused 23 children over 17 years in the 1970s, 80s and 90s at Terenure College in Dublin was jailed for eight years.
- 19 February
  - Ulster Bank confirmed a phased withdrawal from the Republic of Ireland over the coming years that would be managed in an "orderly and considered manner".
  - Deputy Chief Medical Officer Ronan Glynn confirmed that three cases of the Brazilian variant of COVID-19 had been detected in Ireland all associated with travel from Brazil.
  - Strict Level 5 restrictions were expected to remain in place until May as all primary school students were to return by 15 March, with the first four classes in primary schools and Leaving Certificate students the first to return on 1 March.
  - Figures showed that as of 18 February, Gardaí had issued over 8,000 fines to people breaching COVID-19 regulations, with over 6,500 fines issued for non-essential travel and 944 fines issued for attending or hosting house parties.
  - The taoiseach expressed his condolences to the chief medical officer, Tony Holohan, and his family after his wife, Emer, died following a long illness with multiple myeloma.
  - Stephen Silver, a 44-year-old man, was sent for trial to the Central Criminal Court charged with the murder of Detective Garda Colm Horkan in June 2020.
- 20 February
  - The taoiseach stated that pubs and restaurants would likely not reopen until the middle of the summer.
  - Nearly 1,000 patients over the age of 85 received their first dose of a COVID-19 vaccine at the country's first mass vaccination centre at The Helix in Dublin City University.
  - Following a request from the HSE, the Irish Air Corps delivered the first consignment of COVID-19 vaccines to the Aran Islands in County Galway and to Arranmore in County Donegal.
  - The Department of Foreign Affairs announced that the passport service had suspended most of its operations due to Level 5 restrictions, with holidaymakers facing delays of up to two months in securing a passport.
  - Joan Lucey, a 73-year-old retired nurse, who was suing the HSE over cervical smear tests died hours before mediation in the case started.
  - Treaty United were accepted to join the League of Ireland by the Football Association of Ireland.
- 21 February – Facebook shut down and restricted access to a number of Instagram accounts that were advertising an illegal "lockdown rave" on Saint Patrick's Day.
- 22 February
  - The Cabinet COVID-19 sub-committee agreed that Level 5 restrictions would remain in place until 5 April at the earliest under the Government's revised Living with COVID-19 plan, due to be published on 23 February.
  - Special classes in mainstream primary and secondary schools reopened as the phased reopening of schools continued.
  - Celyn Eadon, a 29-year-old man, who stabbed his mother to death after she took his drugs and burned them, was jailed for 14 years.
- 23 February
  - The taoiseach announced the extension of Level 5 lockdown restrictions for another six weeks until 5 April at the earliest as the Government published its new revised Living with COVID-19 plan called "The Path Ahead", which includes the phased reopening of schools and childcare and the extension of the COVID-19 Pandemic Unemployment Payment and the Employment Wage Subsidy Scheme.
  - The minister for health announced an update to the COVID-19 Vaccine Allocation Strategy with people aged between 16 and 69 who are at very high risk of developing severe COVID-19 moved up the priority list, after the National Public Health Emergency Team endorsed recommendations by the National Immunisation Advisory Committee.
- 24 February
  - The minister for health announced that Ireland had ordered enough vaccines to vaccinate 10.3 million people with 18.5 million doses of COVID-19 vaccines ordered.
  - Tánaiste Leo Varadkar addressed a meeting of Fine Gael TDs, Senators and Members of the European Parliament and stated that criticism of how the Government had been communicating was reasonable, had been heard loud and clear, and would be taken on board, after a number of Fine Gael politicians launched an attack on the taoiseach Micheál Martin over his handling of the COVID-19 pandemic.
  - Minister of State for Road Transport Hildegarde Naughton announced a further extension to the expiry dates of driving licences in light of the disruption to licensing services caused by COVID-19 across the European Union, as National Driver Licence Service centres remain open to essential workers during the extended Level 5 restrictions.
- 25 February
  - The director of the National Virus Reference Laboratory Cillian de Gascun confirmed that the first case of the B.1.525 variant of COVID-19, first identified in the United Kingdom and Nigeria, had been detected in Ireland, while a further four cases of the South African variant had been detected, bringing the total to 15.
  - Gardaí began an investigation after a 17-year-old boy was shot several times as he got into a taxi in Dublin on the night of 24 February.
- 26 February
  - Gardaí began a murder investigation following the discovery of the bodies of two elderly brothers at their isolated farm and a third brother in a river nearby in north Cork.
  - A 59-year-old County Tipperary man who raped his partner's six-month-old baby niece over the course of seven months was jailed for 16 years.
  - The Minister for Children, Equality, Disability, Integration and Youth Roderic O'Gorman published a white paper to end direct provision and to establish an international protection system.
  - Revenue officers seized €1.2 million worth of cannabis at Dublin Port.
  - The department of health added a further 13 countries to the government's COVID-19 "high-risk" list for international travel, which brought the total number of countries added to 33.
  - Deputy Chief Medical Officer Ronan Glynn issued a letter appealing to parents to adhere to public health guidelines and not to congregate at school gates or to organise play dates, ahead of schools reopening and the return of 320,000 students from Monday 1 March.
  - Figures released by the Central Statistics Office showed that counties County Dublin, Donegal, Limerick, Louth and Monaghan were the hardest hit counties in terms of COVID cases, while Cavan, Dublin, Kildare, Mayo and Mongahan were the counties with the most deaths.
  - Figures showed that as of 25 February, Gardaí had issued over 9,800 fines to people breaching COVID-19 regulations, with over 7,566 fines issued for non-essential travel and 1,386 fines issued for attending or hosting house parties.
- 27 February – 23 people were arrested and three gardaí were injured (including one hospitalised), as around 500 protesters took part in an anti-lockdown protest in Dublin city centre, with fireworks being fired at gardaí, while St Stephen's Green and the Iveagh Gardens closed in advance of the protest.
- 28 February – Thirteen people, including 12 men and one woman, were charged and remanded in custody for public order offences after anti-lockdown protests in Dublin city centre turned violent on 27 February, while the tánaiste Leo Varadkar stated that the violence on the streets of Dublin was "not a protest and was a riot".

=== March ===
- 1 March
  - Over 320,000 junior primary school pupils and Leaving Certificate students nationwide returned to school for the first time since Christmas.
  - A school in north Dublin confirmed a case of COVID-19 on the first day of reopening schools nationwide as parents received an urgent letter from the school.
  - Bank of Ireland confirmed that it would close 103 branches across the island of Ireland.
- 2 March
  - A man in his 30s was arrested in connection with a firework attack on Gardaí at a violent anti-lockdown protest in Dublin city centre on 27 February.
  - Three men in their 20s were arrested and more than 50 fixed payment notices were issued in Limerick after Gardaí broke up a street party involving large groups of students drinking, dancing, singing and setting of fireworks, near the University of Limerick.
  - A secondary school in Cork confirmed a case of COVID-19 while a south Dublin school announced its closure due to a confirmed case of COVID-19 just one day after schools reopened.
- 3 March
  - One of the three men arrested following a street party in Castletroy, Limerick on the night of 2 March was charged with public order offences, as the University of Limerick warned that any student who were found breaking the university's code of conduct could face temporary suspension or expulsion, while Minister for Justice Helen McEntee urged young people to comply with COVID-19 restrictions.
  - Jake Merriman, a 30-year-old man, appeared in court charged in connection with a firework attack on Gardaí at an anti-lockdown protest in Dublin city centre on 27 February.
  - A large mural of Greta Thunberg in Dublin was vandalised just 24 hours after it was finished.
- 4 March
  - Niall Horan and Denise Chaila were announced as winners at the RTÉ Choice Music Prize awards.
  - A Dublin city mural of Greta Thunberg was repaired after it was vandalised just 24 hours after it was finished.
  - Deputy Chief Medical Officer Ronan Glynn announced that the Department of Health was made aware of four preliminary reports of stillbirths in Ireland that could potentially be associated with a condition called COVID Placentitis.
  - The HSE confirmed that a single outbreak of COVID-19 among students in the west of the country had led to more than 442 further cases in more than 200 separate household outbreaks, involving young adults aged 18 to 24.
- 6 March
  - Taoiseach Micheál Martin announced that Ireland had reached the milestone of half a million COVID-19 vaccines administered.
  - Gardaí arrested 6 people (5 men and 1 woman) as around 450 people attended an anti-lockdown protest in Cork city centre that ended without incident.
  - A man and a woman in their 30s were injured in a shooting in Bluebell, Dublin.
  - The body of a man who went missing after a kayaking accident in County Kildare last weekend was recovered.
- 7 March – President Michael D. Higgins signed into law the legislation to bring in mandatory hotel quarantine for certain passengers entering the country from high-risk countries.
- 8 March
  - HIQA advised NPHET that the duration of immunity following COVID-19 infection should be considered to be six months.
  - Around 100,000 children returned to pre-school under the Early Childhood Care and Education Scheme.
  - The Department of Education and the HSE confirmed that the gradual phased reopening of schools would proceed as planned with all primary pupils and fifth year students returning to school on 15 March.
  - RTÉ officially confirmed that Eoghan McDermott had left his 2FM role as a radio presenter on The RTÉ 2fm Breakfast Show after 3 weeks of "unplanned leave" and that he would not be returning due to the expiry of his contract.
  - Gardaí investigated a threatening phone call that claimed there was a bomb at the home of Minister for Justice Helen McEntee.
  - Seven people were arrested in County Cavan after Gardaí foiled an alleged extortion and blackmail attempt.
- 9 March
  - A man was arrested as part of an investigation into fraudulent claims over the COVID-19 Pandemic Unemployment Payment.
  - Motorists, pedestrians and householders were urged to take care as a Status Yellow wind warning came into effect with winds gusting to over 120kmh.
  - A further three cases of the Brazilian variant were detected in the country, bringing the total to 6.
  - Minister for Education Norma Foley lost her appeals against findings that two home-schooled students were unfairly excluded from the Leaving Certificate calculated grades process.
- 10 March
  - Taoiseach Micheál Martin confirmed that Ireland was to receive a further 46,500 doses of the Pfizer–BioNTech COVID-19 vaccine before the end of March.
  - Met Éireann issued a Status Orange wind warning for Cork and Kerry as very wet and windy weather continued across the country.
- 11 March
  - It was announced that Minister for Justice Helen McEntee would take six months of paid maternity leave from 30 April to 31 October 2021, and would remain a member of the Government without portfolio. Minister for Social Protection Heather Humphreys was assigned responsibility for the Department of Justice, in addition to her current portfolio.
  - Ireland officially marked one year since the first death of COVID-19 in the country was confirmed on 11 March 2020, the same day when COVID-19 was declared a pandemic.
  - A 16-year-old schoolboy was charged with raping a girl at a park in Dublin.
  - Tomasz Krzysztof Piotrowski, a 35-year-old man, was sentenced to life in prison for the murder of his mother in 2019.
  - Under new nursing home visitation guidance approved by NPHET, residents in nursing homes would be permitted two visits per week on general compassionate grounds from 22 March.
- 12 March
  - Latest figures showed that as of 11 March, Gardaí had issued over 13,600 fines to people breaching COVID-19 regulations, with over 10,013 fines issued for non-essential travel and 2,040 fines issued for attending or hosting house parties.
  - Gardaí confirmed that two people were arrested and more than 80 fines were issued after around 300 people gathered for the funeral of a young Traveller man in Carrick-on-Shannon on 11 March, despite Level 5 restrictions limiting mourners to 10 people.
  - Nine residents at a nursing home with an outbreak of COVID-19 in Trim, County Meath died after the first doses of a COVID-19 vaccine were administered there.
  - The Passport Office of the Department of Foreign Affairs was ready to begin issuing more passports to applicants after it expanded the criteria for what was a reasonable excuse to travel during the period of Level 5 restrictions.
- 13 March – More than 100 people gathered outside a church in Dublin for the funeral of George Nkencho, who was shot dead by Gardaí in December 2020.
- 14 March
  - The administration of the AstraZeneca COVID-19 vaccine was suspended in Ireland by the National Immunisation Advisory Committee (NIAC) as a precautionary measure following concerns over serious blood clots in Norway.
  - Gardaí upgraded the inquiry into Tánaiste Leo Varadkar surrounding the leaking of a GP contract to a rival organisation as a criminal investigation.
  - Former editor of The Guardian Alan Rusbridger resigned from the Future of Media Commission after reports that he was supportive of the IRA.
  - There were no new deaths of COVID-19 reported on the island of Ireland.
  - Two men in their 20s were charged after three Gardaí were assaulted following a house party in Milford, County Donegal on 13 March.
- 15 March
  - Over 350,000 remaining primary school pupils and fifth year students nationwide returned to school for the first time since Christmas.
  - 30,000 fewer people received a COVID-19 vaccine from 15 March due to the temporary suspension of the AstraZeneca COVID-19 vaccine in Ireland.
  - President of Sinn Féin Mary Lou McDonald called for Tánaiste Leo Varadkar to resign or be removed as Gardaí continued to investigate the leaking of a GP contract to a rival organisation in 2019.
- 16 March
  - The Garda Síochána urged people to stay at home for St Patrick's Day as a significant policing operation was put in place to deal with planned protests in Dublin city with 2,500 Gardaí being deployed across the country.
  - President Michael D. Higgins thanked Queen Elizabeth for her St Patrick's Day wishes as she acknowledged with fondness her visit to Ireland ten years ago in 2011.
  - Preparations were being finalised for "virtual" St Patrick's Day celebrations across the country, with online events taking place for a second year due to COVID-19 restrictions.
  - Latest figures released by the HSE showed that 1,842 tests for COVID-19 were carried out in 108 schools in the past 7 days, with 44 positive cases confirmed in primary, secondary and special schools across the country.
- 17 March
  - For the second time, there were no traditional St. Patrick's Day parades held in any part of the country.
  - Gardaí arrested 21 people after around 700 protestors took part in a number of anti-lockdown protests in Dublin city centre, Herbert Park and at the RTÉ campus in Donnybrook.
  - Taoiseach Micheál Martin held virtual meetings with US President Joe Biden, Vice President Kamala Harris and Speaker of the House of Representatives Nancy Pelosi.
- 18 March – It was confirmed that 7 Gardaí were injured (including five hospitalised) after being kicked, punched and spat at in separate violent anti-lockdown protests which took place in Dublin on St Patrick's Day.
- 19 March
  - NIAC recommended that the AstraZeneca COVID-19 vaccine could continue to be used in Ireland following approval from the European Medicines Agency (EMA) on 18 March.
  - Latest figures showed that as of 18 March, Gardaí had issued over 15,358 fines to people breaching COVID-19 regulations, with over 11,072 fines issued for non-essential travel and over 2,300 fines issued for attending or hosting house parties.
  - James Bernard McGovern, a Fermanagh boxer, was jailed for over three years for assaulting two senior businessmen at a Cavan filling station in 2019.
- 20 March
  - The HSE resumed administering the AstraZeneca COVID-19 vaccine at a number of hospitals across the country after a precautionary pause.
  - Gardaí arrested 11 people and issued a number of fines after around 200 protestors took part in an anti-lockdown protest in the Phoenix Park in Dublin city centre.
- 21 March – Minister for Public Expenditure and Reform Michael McGrath stated that mandatory hotel quarantine for travellers arriving into Ireland from designated countries would come into effect by the end of the week.
- 22 March
  - Professor Martin Cormican warned that Ireland could be facing another wave of COVID-19 cases and described case numbers as "stuck" and possibly rising, while Chief Clinical Officer Colm Henry described the situation as "disheartening".
  - It was announced that President Michael D. Higgins and his wife Sabina Higgins received their first doses of a COVID-19 vaccine on 19 March.
  - A primary school in Carrick-on-Suir, County Tipperary closed after two positive cases of COVID-19 were confirmed.
- 23 March – The booking portal for mandatory hotel quarantine in Ireland opened for those arriving into the country from Friday 26 March, with a 12-night stay for passengers arriving from high risk countries costing €1,875 each.
- 24 March
  - An Bord Pleanála granted planning permission for what would be the country's tallest building at Custom House Quay in Cork city centre.
  - The Government announced that five new walk-in COVID-19 test centres would open in Dublin and Offaly on 25 March in an effort to bring down cases that are high in certain areas.
  - NPHET postponed a key meeting on deciding whether any Level 5 restrictions could be eased from 5 April so that latest trends in COVID-19 data could be taken into account in its final analysis for the Government.
  - Lidl Ireland sued the Irish Farmers' Association (IFA) for defamation over ads about the supermarket's own-brand milk.
  - The State Examinations Commission and Minister for Education Norma Foley issued new guidelines to schools advising that face coverings would be required during the Leaving Certificate oral exams, which begin on Friday 26 March.
- 25 March
  - The Central Bank of Ireland fined Ulster Bank almost €38 million for dozens of regulatory breaches in its handling of its tracker mortgage customers.
  - An Bord Pleanála gave the green light to Tayto Park for a new €15.5 million "Coaster 2021" rollercoaster for the theme park.
  - A man in his 30s was arrested in Bandon, County Cork in relation to allegedly making fraudulent COVID-19 Pandemic Unemployment Payment claims whilst he was living in southern Asia during 2020.
- 26 March
  - Ireland's mandatory hotel quarantine system for all passengers arriving into the country from high-risk countries came into force at 4 am.
  - The Leader of the Labour Party Alan Kelly called for the chief executive of the Beacon Hospital to resign after it gave 20 leftover COVID-19 vaccines to a number of teachers and staff at a private secondary school in Bray, County Wicklow on 23 March.
  - Latest figures showed that as of 25 March, Gardaí had issued over 16,834 fines to people breaching COVID-19 regulations, with over 12,336 fines issued for non-essential travel and over 2,700 fines issued for attending or hosting house parties.
  - The Department of Education confirmed that the final phase of the gradual reopening of schools would proceed as planned with all remaining secondary school students returning to school after the Easter holidays on 12 April.
  - Two women from Bishopstown in County Cork became the first same-sex couple in the country to be legally recognised as the parents of their babies from birth.
- 27 March
  - Minister for Health Stephen Donnelly requested the HSE to suspend vaccine operations at the Beacon Hospital following controversy after 20 teachers received COVID-19 vaccines at the private hospital.
  - Gardaí began an investigation after three people absconded from a mandatory hotel quarantine facility near Dublin Airport while on a smoking break outside under supervision, with one person located.
  - Met Éireann issued a Status Yellow wind warning for Donegal, Galway, and Mayo with gusts expected to reach up to 100 km/h.
- 28 March – A second person who absconded from a mandatory hotel quarantine facility on 27 March was located, while a search for the third male continued.
- 29 March
  - Latest figures released by the CSO showed that serious crime dropped by over a third in 2020 during the pandemic, while over 1,000 breaches of COVID-19 regulations were classified as crimes by Gardaí including the non-wearing of face coverings and international travel.
  - Gardaí began a criminal investigation after a man in his 50s was found seriously injured in an apartment complex in Dublin city centre.
- 30 March
  - The Government announced a phased easing of Level 5 restrictions from Monday 12 April, with people allowed to travel within their county, two households allowed to meet socially outdoors, people who are fully vaccinated against COVID-19 allowed to meet other fully vaccinated people indoors, and the resumption of all residential construction projects from that date.
  - Minister for Health Stephen Donnelly announced an update to the COVID-19 Vaccine Allocation Strategy with priority groups being changed to an age-based system after vulnerable people with underlying conditions were vaccinated.
  - Gardaí began a murder investigation after a 52-year-old man died from stab wounds in Dublin city centre on 29 March, while a man and a woman were arrested.
  - The HSE confirmed that three passengers staying in mandatory hotel quarantine tested positive for COVID-19.
  - The CEO of VHI stepped aside pending an investigation into his receipt of a COVID-19 vaccine at the Beacon Hospital.
- 31 March
  - Irish journalist Yvonne Murray, who reports for RTÉ News and Current Affairs from China, was forced to leave the country because of mounting pressure from the Chinese authorities and over sinister threats to her husband.
  - Taoiseach Micheál Martin confirmed that shoe shops would be allowed to sell children's footwear by appointment only.
  - The Taoiseach told the Dáil that a national portal allowing for everyone to register for a COVID-19 vaccine would be available by the third week in April.
  - The HSE announced that seven new walk-in COVID-19 testing centres for asymptomatic people would open from April in Dublin, Meath, Westmeath, Kildare and Galway in an effort to bring down cases that are high in certain areas.
  - A 47-year-old man appeared in court charged with the murder of a 52-year-old man in Dublin on 29 March.

=== April ===
- 1 April
  - Deputy Chief Medical Officer Ronan Glynn and Northern Ireland Chief Medical Officer Michael McBride issued a joint statement urging the public across Ireland to continue to follow public health advice to ensure everyone can have a safe Easter.
  - An independent review of the COVID-19 vaccination programme at the Coombe Hospital found that a consultant brought two leftover vaccine doses home to administer them to two family members.
  - Dublin GAA suspended senior football manager Dessie Farrell for 12 weeks after a number of Dublin footballers were photographed attending a training session on the morning of 31 March in breach of COVID-19 regulations.
  - Plans by the Department of Health to expand mandatory hotel quarantine to 43 additional countries, including the United States, Germany and France, sparked a major row within Government, after the Attorney General, the European Union and a number of ministers expressed concerns about the plans.
  - A new code of conduct aimed to give employees the right to switch off from work outside of normal working hours, including the right to not respond immediately to emails, telephone calls or other messages was signed into effect by Tánaiste and Minister for Enterprise, Trade and Employment Leo Varadkar.
  - The Department of Health added a further 26 countries to the Government's COVID-19 "high-risk" list for international travel and removed one country, which brought the total number of countries added to 59.
- 2 April – Two women in their 30s were arrested and charged after refusing to enter mandatory hotel quarantine upon arrival in Dublin Airport from Dubai.
- 3 April – Around 300 protestors took part in an anti-lockdown protest at the National Monument on the Grand Parade in Cork city centre.
- 4 April
  - Gardaí arrested 8 people as part of a policing plan around an anti-lockdown protest planned in Dublin city centre.
  - The High Court made orders allowing two women who refused to enter mandatory hotel quarantine after arriving into Dublin Airport following their return from a trip to Dubai for cosmetic procedures to leave Mountjoy Women's Prison and continue to quarantine at a designated hotel.
  - Two non-public events led by President Michael D. Higgins to commemorate the 1916 Easter Rising took place at Áras an Uachtaráin and at the GPO in O'Connell Street.
- 6 April
  - A number of Gardaí were forced to self-isolate after a guest staying at a quarantine hotel tested positive for COVID-19.
  - Minister for Education Norma Foley defended the Government decision to change the vaccine roll-out schedule to an aged-based system stating it was "not a value judgement on any given profession", as teachers' unions continued to call for their members to be prioritised.
  - Three women who absconded from a mandatory hotel quarantine facility in Dublin were found by Gardaí almost 200 km away near Loughrea, County Galway.
- 7 April
  - The three teacher unions voted for an emergency motion backing industrial action, up to and including strike action, if they were not prioritised for vaccination.
  - Minister for Health Stephen Donnelly confirmed that a failure to follow vaccination reserve list protocols led to teachers and special needs assistants (SNAs) in a number of special needs schools in Dublin and Wicklow to receive COVID-19 vaccinations from the Health Service Executive (HSE) on 6 April.
- 8 April
  - People were being warned about a "sophisticated" phone scam where members of the public were targeted by criminals purporting to be a named official from the Department of Social Protection.
  - Monaghan GAA suspended senior football manager Séamus McEnaney for 12 weeks after a dossier sent to the Department of Justice showed video and photographic evidence of a training session taking place in breach of COVID-19 regulations.
  - The CEO of the HSE Paul Reid announced that Ireland had reached the milestone of one million COVID-19 vaccines administered.
  - The Health Products Regulatory Authority (HPRA) began an investigation after the first case of a very rare blood clot in the brain of a person after vaccination with the AstraZeneca vaccine was confirmed in a 40-year-old Dublin woman.
  - Latest figures from the HSE showed that 10 confirmed cases of COVID-19 had been detected among arrivals into Ireland who were in mandatory hotel quarantine.
  - Taoiseach Micheál Martin and Minister for Foreign Affairs Simon Coveney condemned the ongoing unrest and violence in Northern Ireland and both called for calm.
- 9 April
  - President Michael D. Higgins and Taoiseach Micheál Martin paid tributes to Prince Philip, Duke of Edinburgh following his death in Windsor Castle.
  - The HSE announced that five new walk-in COVID-19 testing centres for asymptomatic people would open from 10 April in Dublin, Limerick and Waterford in an effort to bring down cases that are high in certain areas.
  - A Garda was being treated in hospital in Cork after she was dragged by a car for around 30 metres during a drugs search in Baltimore on the night of 8 April.
  - A fully vaccinated woman quarantining in a Dublin hotel after her arrival into the country from Israel asked the High Court for an inquiry into what she claimed amounted to unlawful detention.
  - Latest figures showed that as of 8 April, Gardaí had issued over 19,865 fines to people breaching COVID-19 regulations, with over 13,972 fines issued for non-essential travel and over 3,300 fines issued for attending or hosting house parties.
  - Following an incorporeal Cabinet meeting, the Department of Health added a further 16 countries to the Government's COVID-19 "high-risk" list for international travel and removed three countries, which would come into effect from 4 am on Thursday 15 April.
- 10 April – Rachael Blackmore became the first woman to win the Grand National.
- 11 April – An Irish man and an Israeli woman who challenged their detention in mandatory hotel quarantine and claimed they had been fully vaccinated against COVID-19 were released pending court hearings.
- 12 April
  - The phased easing of Level 5 restrictions began with the 5 km travel limit lifted, the resumption of all residential construction work, two households could meet up outdoors and the full reopening of all schools.
  - The NIAC recommend that only people over 60 years of age should get the AstraZeneca COVID-19 vaccine and that a second dose of the vaccine should not be given to anyone who developed unusual blood clots with low platelets after the first dose.
  - A man in his 40s appeared in court facing 232 charges of sexual assault, sexual exploitation, cruelty and other charges.
- 13 April
  - The HSE announced that all AstraZeneca clinics were cancelled for the rest of the week, except for those arranged for certain people aged over 60.
  - Minister for Health Stephen Donnelly announced that mandatory hotel quarantine bookings were paused on a precautionary basis, in order to ramp up capacity in the system.
  - A three-year-old girl died following a road traffic accident in County Tipperary.
- 16 April
  - KBC Bank Ireland announced that it was in discussions about the possible sale of its performing loan assets and liabilities to Bank of Ireland.
  - The European Commission urged the Government of Ireland to amend or possibly scrap mandatory hotel quarantine for EU citizens and sought clarifications as to why a number of EU member states were subject to the rules.
  - Latest figures showed that as of 15 April, Gardaí had issued over 20,280 fines to people breaching COVID-19 regulations, with over 14,650 fines issued for non-essential travel and over 3,500 fines issued for attending or hosting house parties.
- 17 April
  - The national flag at State buildings was flown at half-mast as a mark of respect for Prince Philip, whose funeral took place.
  - Gardaí began a murder investigation after a 24-year-old woman was fatally stabbed in Dublin.
- 18 April – President Michael D. Higgins celebrated his 80th birthday.
- 19 April
  - A 29-year-old man was charged with the murder of his partner, Jennifer Poole, in Dublin on 17 April.
  - The Director of the National Virus Reference Laboratory Cillian de Gascun confirmed that three cases of the B.1.617 variant of COVID-19, first identified in India, had been detected in the Republic of Ireland.
- 20 April
  - A nursing home in County Louth suspended all indoor visits after two staff members who had been fully vaccinated tested positive for COVID-19.
  - The Department of Health confirmed that Chief Medical Officer Tony Holohan had returned to work after taking leave following the death of his wife.
- 21 April – Carphone Warehouse confirmed its closure of all 80 stores in the Republic of Ireland with 486 jobs.
- 22 April
  - An outbreak of at least 70 COVID-19 cases was confirmed at Intel's construction site in Leixlip, County Kildare.
  - Gardaí made a direct appeal to a 14-year-old girl missing from County Louth to contact them.
- 25 April – A 22-year-old man died after falling 20 metres into a blowhole from cliffs in County Cork.
- 26 April
  - The further easing of Level 5 restrictions came into effect with all sports pitches, golf courses, tennis courts, zoos, pet farms and heritage sites reopening.
  - Minister for Health Stephen Donnelly announced that Ireland was to donate 700 oxygen concentrators to India as part of efforts to assist with the COVID-19 outbreak in the country.
- 27 April
  - New recommendations by NIAC were approved by the Government with the Johnson & Johnson and AstraZeneca COVID-19 vaccines recommended for people aged 50 and older, pregnant women offered an mRNA vaccine between 14 and 36 weeks gestation, and people aged under 50 years who had a COVID-19 infection receiving just one vaccine dose and be considered fully-vaccinated.
  - A primary school in County Offaly closed following confirmation of 23 cases of COVID-19.
  - Former Housing Minister Eoghan Murphy resigned his seat as a TD for Dublin Bay South to pursue a career in international co-operation, human rights and democracy.
  - A former Sinn Féin councillor was charged at the Special Criminal Court with the murder of David Byrne at the Regency Hotel in 2016.
- 29 April
  - The Government announced a reopening plan for the country throughout May and June from 10 May, with inter-county travel allowed, the reopening of all hairdressers, libraries, museums and galleries, up to 50 people allowed to attend religious services, the resumption of click-and-collect services and the allowances of three households to meet outdoors (including in private gardens) and a vaccinated household to meet an unvaccinated household indoors from that date.
  - Four Gardaí and a private citizen were charged as part of a two-year investigation into alleged Garda corruption in the south of the country.
- 30 April
  - Minister for Health Stephen Donnelly announced that nearly 150 cases of variants of concern had been identified in Ireland, including: 71 cases of the South African variant, 27 cases of the Brazilian variant, 8 cases of the Indian variant, 6 cases of the New York variant and 20 cases of the Nigerian variant.
  - The Department of Health added a further 5 countries to the Government's COVID-19 "high-risk" list for international travel and removed 6 countries, which would come into effect from 4 am on Tuesday 4 May.
  - Chief Medical Officer Tony Holohan stated that there were concerns around the level of COVID-19 in Donegal and that there were outbreaks occurring in lots of different settings in the county.
  - Latest figures showed that as of 29 April, Gardaí had issued over 20,974 fines to people breaching COVID-19 regulations, with over 14,749 fines issued for non-essential travel and over 3,900 fines issued for attending or hosting house parties.
  - Three people were arrested after Gardaí seized over €1 million worth of suspected cocaine, cannabis and tablets during searches in County Meath.

=== May ===
- 1 May
  - Around 370 protestors took part in an anti-lockdown protest at the National Monument on the Grand Parade in Cork city centre.
  - The HSE announced that seven new walk-in COVID-19 testing centres for asymptomatic people would open in Dublin, Cork, Kildare and Mayo in an effort to bring down cases that are high in certain areas.
- 3 May
  - In an open letter to those who had been fully vaccinated, Chief Medical Officer Tony Holohan praised the sacrifices people had made over the past year and advised those who were vaccinated to make the most of socialising outdoors.
  - Gardaí began an investigation of an incident at Howth DART station in which a woman was knocked onto a train track in April.
- 4 May – A special hotline to allow the public to inform the Gardaí about illegal parties or gatherings in County Donegal was set up in response to a spike in the number of COVID-19 cases in the county in recent days.
- 5 May
  - A 15-year-old boy was charged with the murder of 48-year-old mother-of-two Urantsetseg Tserendorja, who was originally from Mongolia, in Dublin in January.
  - An Post confirmed that the price of a postage stamp for a standard letter was to increase by 10 cent to €1.10 from the end of May.
- 6 May
  - A 22-year-old man appeared in court charged with the murder of a 76-year-old man, Kwok Ping Cheng, who was attacked with an axe at his home in Dublin on 29 April.
  - The first doses of the Janssen COVID-19 vaccine (Johnson & Johnson) were administered through homeless services at a temporary vaccination clinic set up in Dublin.
  - Around 120 revellers defied an emergency court order after attending a post-wedding celebration involving members of the Traveller community in a marquee in County Longford on 5 May.
- 7 May
  - The Department of Tourism, Culture, Arts, Gaeltacht, Sport and Media announced that all summer Irish language college courses in the Gaeltacht were cancelled for a second year running.
  - Teva Pharmaceuticals confirmed plans to close its Sudocrem production plant in Dublin by the end of 2022, with the loss of more than 100 jobs.
  - A 46-year-old man was jailed for life for the murder of his estranged wife's partner in 2019.
  - An Asian hornet was identified in the wild in Ireland for the first time.
- 8 May
  - More than 140,000 people across the world signed up to participate in the Darkness into Light event to raise funds for suicide prevention charity Pieta House.
  - The Department of Health added a further 2 countries to the Government's COVID-19 "high-risk" list for international travel and removed 11 countries, which would come into effect from 4 am on Wednesday 12 May.
- 9 May – Taoiseach Micheál Martin received his first dose of a COVID-19 vaccine in Cork City Hall and urged people to get vaccinated to protect themselves, while a record 52,278 doses were administered on Friday 7 May.
- 10 May
  - The further easing of Level 5 restrictions came into effect with all hairdressers, barbers, beauticians, galleries, museums, libraries and other cultural attractions reopening, the resumption of non-essential retail on a phased basis, inter-county travel and in-person religious services, and the allowance of three households (or six people) from individual households to meet outdoors.
  - The Central Criminal Court lifted an order preventing the identification of an 11-year-old boy who was murdered by a relative in November 2019.
  - Met Éireann issued a Status Yellow thunderstorm warning for 13 counties in Leinster, Ulster and Munster, with hail and heavy downpours, and a risk of spot flooding forecast.
  - The Irish Prison Service confirmed that an outbreak of 19 cases of COVID-19 had been identified at Mountjoy Prison.
- 13 May
  - A man and woman, both in their mid-40s, died in a house fire in County Roscommon, about 13 km from Ballinasloe, County Galway at around 2 am.
  - Three teenage boys were arrested in connection with an attack on young girls at Howth Junction DART station in Dublin in April.
- 14 May
  - The Health Service Executive shut down all of its IT systems after a major ransomware cyberattack, with many hospital appointments cancelled, while the COVID-19 vaccination programme had not been affected by the attack.
  - A former RTÉ sports producer pleaded guilty to child sex abuse offences in Ireland, the UK and the Philippines.
  - A retired Garda superintendent, two Garda sergeants, and two Gardaí, were charged with attempting to pervert the course of justice at Limerick District Court.
  - The 2021 National Ploughing Championships, due to have taken place in County Laois in September, was cancelled for a second year due to uncertainty over COVID-19 restrictions.
- 15 May
  - The HSE stated that there was "substantial cancellations across all outpatient services with widespread cancellation of radiology services" following a ransomware attack on its IT systems.
  - The Department of Health announced that there would be no daily COVID-19 figures update provided due to the HSE cyberattack, with backdated figures being published "when possible".
  - The Department of Health removed 5 countries from the Government's COVID-19 "high-risk" list for international travel with immediate effect. The countries removed were: Bermuda, Iran, Montenegro, Palestine and Serbia.
  - Several thousand people attended a protest in support of Palestine in Dublin city centre, amid rising tensions and violence in Gaza.
- 16 May
  - The Department of Health confirmed that it had been the victim of a separate cyber attack similar to the ransomware attack on the Health Service Executive, prompting the shutting down of much of its IT infrastructure.
  - President Michael D. Higgins and Department of Tourism, Culture, Arts, Gaeltacht, Sport and Media Catherine Martin officiated at the National Famine Commemoration at Glasnevin Cemetery in Dublin.
- 17 May
  - The further easing of Level 5 restrictions came into effect with the reopening of all non-essential retail for the first time in over four months.
  - The National Immunisation Advisory Committee (NIAC) confirmed that people in their 40s would be given a choice to accept the Janssen or AstraZeneca COVID-19 vaccine or opt to wait for another vaccine.
- 18 May – Ireland's Lesley Roy failed to qualify for the Eurovision Song Contest Grand Final 2021.
- 19 May
  - The COVID-19 vaccine registration portal opened to people aged between 45 and 49 on a phased basis, starting with people aged 49.
  - Pfizer announced that it would begin using its west Dublin facility as part of its supply chain for its COVID-19 vaccine.
- 20 May
  - A 44-year-old woman who suffocated her three children was found not guilty of murder by reason of insanity.
  - It was reported that the organised cyber crime group that attacked the HSE and the Department of Health IT systems provided a decryption key, while the public was advised to be aware of a number of call and text scams in the wake of the cyber attack.
- 21 May – Minister for Rural and Community Development Heather Humphreys announced the return of the Tidy Towns competition after it was cancelled in 2020 due to the pandemic.
- 22 May – The Department of Health removed 6 countries from the Government's COVID-19 "high-risk" list for international travel with immediate effect.
- 25 May – A man was arrested after two Gardaí were injured in a shooting in Blanchardstown.
- 26 May – Under new COVID-19 safety guidelines issued by Fáilte Ireland, a maximum of six people aged 13 years and over would be allowed per table when restaurants, pubs and cafés open in June, with up to 15 people allowed when accompanying children under the age of 12.
- 27 May – The Chief Executive of the HSE Paul Reid stated that the cost of the cyber attack on its IT systems could exceed €100 million.
- 28 May
  - A 38-year-old man, Daniel Goulding, was charged with five firearm offences after shots were fired from a house in Blanchardstown on the night of 25 May.
  - The HSE confirmed that data relating to 520 patients, including sensitive information, was published online following the ransomware attack on 14 May.
  - The Government announced a further reopening plan for the country throughout June, July and August, with the reopening of all hotels from 2 June, outdoor hospitality, cinemas, swimming pools, gyms from 7 June, and indoor hospitality from 5 July.
  - The Department of Health removed 4 countries from the Government's COVID-19 "high-risk" list for international travel with immediate effect.
- 29 May – Four people were arrested for public order offences after large crowds gathered in parts of Dublin city centre, while Chief Medical Officer Tony Holohan stated that he was "absolutely shocked" by the crowds that gathered.
- 31 May – It was announced that the 2021 edition of the Rose of Tralee would be cancelled for the second year in a row.

=== June ===
- 1 June
  - According to a new study published by the Irish Medical Journal, medics reported what they believed to be the first case of COVID-19 reinfection in Ireland in a 40-year-old female healthcare worker.
  - The Government launched a €3.5 billion Economic Recovery Plan to achieve rapid job creation and economic growth after the pandemic, with the COVID-19 Pandemic Unemployment Payment and the Employment Wage Subsidy Scheme extended until September 2021, when gradual reductions would begin.
- 2 June
  - The COVID-19 vaccine registration portal opened to people aged between 40 and 44 on a phased basis, starting with people aged 44.
  - The gradual easing of COVID-19 restrictions on the tourism and hospitality sector came into effect with the reopening of all hotels, B&Bs, self-catering accommodation and hostels.
  - A probationary Garda avoided a jail sentence for breaching COVID-19 restrictions, and instead received a €1,000 fine for the breach along with a charge for being intoxicated in public.
  - The Department of Education announced that Leaving Certificate results would be delayed for a second year in a row, with students to receive their results on 3 September.
  - The Director of the National Virus Reference Laboratory Cillian de Gascun confirmed that there had been 115 cases of the Indian variant of COVID-19 detected in Ireland.
- 3 June
  - HIQA advised NPHET that the duration of immunity following COVID-19 infection should be extended from six to nine months.
  - The Government's emergency COVID-19 powers including additional Garda powers introduced to deal with COVID-19 was extended until November 2021.
  - Minister for Further and Higher Education Simon Harris stated that he expected students and staff to be back on campus for the new academic year of 2021/22.
  - Dublin City Council confirmed that it was to install toilets, bins across the city from the bank holiday weekend, along with staff to maintain them, following criticism of a lack of facilities in the capital to allow people to socialise outdoors.
  - A man died while climbing Mount Brandon in County Kerry.
- 4 June
  - Minister of State with responsibility for the Office of Public Works Patrick O'Donovan appealed to people visiting St Stephen's Green in Dublin to respect the site after reckless behaviour was witnessed on 3 June when a group of people gained access to the bandstand which had been fenced off for health and safety reasons.
  - A man in his 20s died after getting into difficulty while swimming off the Dalkey coast in Dublin.
- 5 June
  - 14 people (including 5 juveniles) were arrested for public order offences and a Garda received hospital treatment on the night of 4 June, after violence broke out in Dublin city centre in which glass bottles were thrown at Gardaí, which resulted in a patrol car being damaged. Minister for Health Stephen Donnelly described the incidents as "thuggish behaviour and completely unacceptable".
  - Minister for Health Stephen Donnelly received his first dose of a COVID-19 vaccine in Greystones, County Wicklow.
  - The Department of Health added a further 5 countries to the Government's COVID-19 "high-risk" list for international travel, which would come into effect from 4 am on Tuesday 8 June.
- 6 June – 19 people (including 2 juveniles) were arrested for public order offences and two Gardaí received hospital treatment on the night of 5 June, after violence broke out in Dublin's south city centre for a second consecutive night in which a person was assaulted, a bin was set on fire and glass bottles were thrown, which resulted in a patrol car being damaged.
- 7 June
  - A three-month-old baby girl died after being attacked by a dog in west Waterford.
  - The gradual easing of COVID-19 restrictions continued with the reopening of all bars, restaurants and cafés for outdoor service, gyms, swimming pools, leisure centres, cinemas and theatres, the partial resumption of driver theory test services, and the allowance of an unvaccinated household to visit another unvaccinated household indoors.
  - 14 people (including 3 juveniles) were arrested for public order offences on the night of 6 June, after violence broke out in Dublin's south city centre for a third consecutive night, while Gardaí arrested 8 people in Cork.
- 9 June
  - The United States Biden administration formally rebuked the United Kingdom in a rare démarche concerning the effects of the UK government's handling of Brexit on Northern Ireland. The US accused the UK of inflaming tensions in Europe and the North.
  - Leaving Certificate exams got underway at schools throughout the country, with far lower numbers of students sitting individual exams compared to a normal year.
  - A 46-year-old man pleaded guilty to murdering Rose Hanrahan, 78, at her Limerick home four years ago in 2017.
- 10 June
  - A Garda appeared in court charged with coercive control, criminal damage, sexual assault, assault causing harm and harassment of his former partner over a three-year period.
  - The first in a series of live pilot concerts took place at the Iveagh Gardens, Dublin, with James Vincent McMorrow and special guest Sorcha Richardson playing to 500 people at the show.
- 15 June
  - The Government agreed to increase the self-isolation period for travellers arriving in Ireland from Britain from 5 to 10 days for those who are not fully vaccinated amid Delta variant concerns.
  - Thousands of people from Donegal and Mayo gathered in Dublin for a protest in support of a 100% redress scheme for homes and other buildings affected by blocks defective due to the mineral mica.
- 16 June – Legislation was passed, the Climate Action and Low Carbon Development (Amendment) Bill 2021, to halve greenhouse gas emissions within nine years and to achieve a climate neutral economy ("net zero") by 2050. Farmers marched in Dublin to protest against effects of the Bill on farming and rural communities.
- 17 June – HSE Chief Clinical Officer Colm Henry confirmed that there had been 180 cases of the Delta variant detected in Ireland.
- 18 June – Three men were arrested on the night of 17 June following an altercation on South William Street in which glass bottles were thrown at staff members of a premises.
- 19 June
  - A primary school in County Offaly confirmed a suspected case of the Delta variant with the children told to self isolate at home.
  - After discussing the evolving profile of COVID-19 across the island, the Chief Medical Officers of Ireland and Northern Ireland Tony Holohan and Michael McBride issued a joint statement reminding people who intended to travel across the border to be alert to the epidemiological situation in the relevant local areas and to ensure that they avoid activities which could place them or their families at risk of COVID-19 infection.
  - A young man was rushed to hospital with suspected stab injuries after a fight broke out involving up to 30 people near St Stephen's Green.
- 20 June – The COVID-19 vaccine registration portal opened to people aged between 35 and 39 on a phased basis, starting with people aged 39.
- 21 June
  - An inquest into the death of George Nkencho formally opened in the Dublin coroner's court held in the RDS before being adjourned for six months until 14 December.
  - Gardaí in Dublin began a murder investigation after a man in his 60s was stabbed to death at his home in south County Dublin on the night of 20 June.
  - Minister for Justice Heather Humphreys spoke to Garda Commissioner Drew Harris about the legal issues around outdoor drinking and pledged to take legislative action to facilitate outdoor hospitality if it was required, after Gardaí warned that alcohol licences were not valid for areas outside pubs and restaurants.
  - Chief Medical Officer Tony Holohan stated that the latest data showed a "concerning increase in transmission" of the Delta variant of COVID-19 in Ireland.
- 22 June
  - The HSE's Director of Public Health for the Midlands Una Fallon announced that a COVID-19 outbreak in Athlone had been identified as "probably" the Delta variant after a cluster of 14 primary cases associated with socialising by the River Shannon were confirmed on Friday 11 June.
  - A 30-year-old man appeared in court charged with the murder of his 65-year-old father in Dublin on 20 June.
- 23 June – It was confirmed that at least three quarters of the HSE's IT servers had been decrypted and 70% of computer devices were back in use, following the cyber attack in May.
- 24 June
  - HSE Chief Clinical Officer Colm Henry confirmed that there had been 210 cases of the Delta variant detected in Ireland.
  - Garda Commissioner Drew Harris publicly apologised to domestic violence victims who made emergency calls for help but did not receive the standard of service from Gardaí that they required and to which they were entitled.
- 27 June – Phase 1 of the BusConnects transport infrastructure programme was launched in Dublin.
- 29 June – Due to the rapidly increasing incidence of the Delta variant, the Government announced that the planned reopening of indoor dining and drinking in restaurants and pubs on 5 July would be delayed until at least 19 July when a system to verify vaccination or immunity would be implemented, while 50 guests would be permitted to attend wedding celebrations as an exception from July.
- 30 June
  - Minister for Education Norma Foley announced that 2022 Leaving Certificate students would be granted more choice and more time in State exam papers to compensate for the loss of learning they had suffered.
  - European Commissioner for Justice Didier Reynders stated that Ireland was the only European Union member state that would not be ready to comply with the EU Digital COVID-19 Certificate for travel when it would come into effect from 1 July 2021 due to the cyber attack on the Health Service Executive.

=== July ===
- 1 July – Chief Medical Officer Tony Holohan announced that a fourth wave of COVID-19 was beginning in Ireland following an increase in cases caused by the Delta variant.
- 2 July
  - Minister for Health Stephen Donnelly announced an expansion of the vaccination rollout programme to younger people with 750 pharmacies to begin administering the Janssen COVID-19 vaccine to people in the 18 to 34 age group who opted in for earlier vaccination from 5 July, while vaccination centres would begin administering the AstraZeneca vaccine to the group from 12 July.
  - The Government agreed a deal to purchase one million unwanted COVID-19 vaccine doses from Romania.
  - A man died in a fall on the Dartry Mountains in County Sligo.
- 3 July – Over 3,500 people attended a pilot music festival featuring Gavin James, Denise Chaila and Sharon Shannon in Dublin, with antigen testing used for entry.
- 5 July
  - Over 500 pharmacies around the country began administering the Janssen COVID-19 vaccine to people aged 18 to 34 who opted-in to receive it.
  - In a statement, Chief Medical Officer Tony Holohan stated that more than 70% of all cases were now accounted for by the Delta variant, as it continued to present a risk to those who were unvaccinated or waiting for a second dose of vaccine.
  - A meeting between the hospitality sector and senior government officials took place to discuss the reopening of indoor dining and drinking with representatives told that indoor dining could reopen for 1.8 million fully vaccinated people with a self-regulated vaccine pass system.
  - A 47-year-old Romanian man was jailed for life for the murder of 78-year-old Rose Hanrahan in Limerick in 2017.
- 6 July
  - Deutsche Bank announced plans to cut up to 450 full-time and contractor roles at its Dublin office.
  - A 44-year-old man who stabbed a fisherman 40 times following a row over drugs was jailed for ten years.
- 7 July
  - The COVID-19 vaccine registration portal opened to people aged between 30 and 34 on a phased basis, starting with people aged 34.
  - The 2021 Dublin Marathon was cancelled for the second year in a row.
  - A teenage boy died and another was critically injured in a single vehicle road crash in County Kerry at around 1:10 am.
- 8 July
  - The Chief Executive of the HSE Paul Reid stated that the Delta variant was to "outmatch" Ireland's supply of COVID-19 vaccines in July, while latest figures showed that 352 cases of the Delta variant had been detected in Ireland.
  - An investigation got under way after three men were killed in a collision between a car and a lorry on the N7 at Rathcoole in Dublin.
  - Over 1,000,000 people watched RTÉ's coverage of England's UEFA Euro 2020 semi-final clash with Denmark on the evening of 7 July.
- 9 July
  - AA Roadwatch ended its radio traffic and travel reports after 32 years.
  - Basketball Ireland began an investigation after the Chief Executive Bernard O'Byrne posted on social media asking if England player Raheem Sterling should have been awarded a penalty in their UEFA Euro 2020 semi-final win over Denmark, which included the phrase "Black Dives Matter".
  - The Labour Party's Ivana Bacik won the Dublin Bay South by-election.
- 10 July – Former Minister for Agriculture, Food and the Marine Barry Cowen requested a special meeting of the Fianna Fáil parliamentary party to discuss the result of the Dublin Bay South by-election, after the party's candidate, Deirdre Conroy, received just 5% of the share of first preference votes.
- 12 July
  - Over 1.1 million people watched RTÉ's coverage of Italy's UEFA Euro 2020 final victory against England on the evening of 11 July.
  - Fully vaccinated people began receiving their EU Digital COVID-19 Certificates via email or post.
  - The Government approved legislation for the resumption of indoor hospitality, with proofs of vaccination needed for those who were vaccinated or recovered from COVID-19, while those under 18 would be required to be accompanied by a fully vaccinated person.
- 13 July
  - It was revealed that people aged 16 and over would be offered a vaccine by the end of September, with the Government examining the possibility of vaccinating those aged 12 to 15 during the autumn, while it was confirmed that children aged under 12 would not now need to take a PCR test when entering the country.
  - The Chief Executive of Basketball Ireland Bernard O'Byrne stepped down with immediate effect following his "ill-judged" social media comment regarding Raheem Sterling.
- 14 July
  - Gardaí seized over €34 million worth of cocaine disguised as coal, which was concealed in a shipment of bags to Ireland.
  - The National Car Testing (NCT) service revoked 34,000 two-year NCT certificates incorrectly issued due to a system error.
- 15 July
  - Hundreds of people gathered outside the Convention Centre in Dublin on the night of 14 July to protest against the Government's response to the COVID-19 pandemic after the Dáil passed legislation to allow for the reopening of indoor dining.
  - Two men were arrested in connection with the investigation into the armed robbery of a credit union in County Louth over eight years ago in 2013 during which a Garda was shot dead.
- 16 July
  - Chief Medical Officer Tony Holohan stated that cases of COVID-19 were increasing in 22 out of 26 counties, with the majority of cases occurring in people who had not been fully vaccinated, after 1,173 cases were reported – the highest number since February.
  - Weekend temperatures were set to reach 27 degrees Celsius across the country, as Met Éireann said it had been the hottest day of the year so far.
  - UEFA confirmed that the Aviva Stadium would host the 2024 Europe League final.
- 17 July
  - Met Éireann recorded a temperature of 29.5 degrees Celsius in Athenry, County Galway, making it the hottest day of the year so far.
  - COVID-19 cases continued to rise after a further 1,377 cases were reported, the highest in six months.
- 18 July – Met Éireann issued a High Temperature Advisory with temperatures expected to be in the high 20s for the next week.
- 19 July – Ireland joined the rest of the EU in implementing the Digital COVID-19 Certificate as travel restrictions into and out of the country eased.
- 20 July
  - Met Éireann issued a Status Orange high temperature warning for six counties in the Midlands and the rest of the country on a Status Yellow warning, with temperatures expected to reach 30 degrees Celsius in some areas.
  - It was announced that AIB was set to close 15 branches in urban and suburban areas in the Republic of Ireland and merge their operations with others nearby.
- 21 July
  - The Government agreed that indoor dining in pubs and restaurants could resume on Monday 26 July for fully vaccinated and COVID-19 recovered people, after President Michael D. Higgins signed the legislation underpinning new guidelines into law.
  - Met Éireann recorded a temperature of 30.1 degrees Celsius at Mount Dillon in County Roscommon, making it the hottest day of the year so far.
- 22 July
  - A woman in her late 20s died in a drowning incident on the Longford–Cavan border, while in a separate incident, a man in his 70s drowned in County Leitrim.
  - Met Éireann extended the Status Yellow high temperature warning issued nationwide to Saturday 24 July.
  - Ireland had its first tropical night in 20 years after temperatures stayed above 20 degrees in certain parts of the country.
  - Deputy Chief Medical Officer Ronan Glynn stated that the number of COVID-19 cases related to overseas travel had increased "very sharply", after it was revealed that the Delta variant now accounted for 90% of cases in Ireland.
- 23 July
  - The Chair of the NPHET Epidemiological Modelling Advisory Group Philip Nolan stated that people had forgotten how easily the virus spread and that people were "getting too close".
  - Met Éireann issued a Status Orange thunderstorm and rain warning for Galway, Clare and Tipperary and the rest of the country on a Status Yellow warning.
  - A man in his 60s died after being recovered from the sea in Dublin.
  - Draft guidelines for the reopening of bars and restaurants indoors on Monday 26 July were published. Under the guidelines, the EU Digital COVID Certificate (DCC) would be the primary evidence for proof of immunity, all customers would have to show photo ID and contact tracing details for all customers would have to be taken, with an online QR code scanner developed to verify people's DCCs.
- 24 July – Around 1,500 protestors gathered in Dublin city centre to protest against vaccines, new legislation allowing for the reopening of indoor dining and the Digital COVID Certificate.
- 26 July
  - Restaurants, cafés and bars reopened for indoor dining and drinking for the first time since December 2020, operating under strict new public health regulations.
  - Minister for Education Norma Foley stated that she was confident that a full reopening of schools from late August and early September would go ahead as planned.
  - Met Éireann issued a Status Yellow rain and thunderstorm warning for Ireland.
  - A man in his 60s died after getting into difficulty while swimming at Tramore beach in County Waterford.
  - A specialist at the Department of Public Health in the Midlands raised concerns about gatherings of teenagers and young adults who wanted to deliberately catch COVID-19 so they could get their Digital COVID Certificate of Recovery.
- 27 July
  - After the COVID-19 vaccine registration portal opened to people aged 16 and 17 for the Pfizer or Moderna vaccines, the Government agreed to extend the COVID-19 vaccination programme to those aged 12 to 15 and to increase the limit of number of guests permitted at weddings from 50 to 100 from 5 August.
  - Gardaí began a major investigation after a female member of the Defence Forces was allegedly raped by a male colleague in a mandatory quarantine hotel facility in Dublin.
- 28 July
  - It was announced that some of the 38 vaccination centres would allow walk-in vaccinations on certain days and times without an appointment.
  - Minister for Health Stephen Donnelly confirmed that children would not have to be vaccinated against COVID-19 to attend school.
  - Joe Canning announced his retirement from inter-county hurling at the age of 32.
  - Following criticism of former Minister for Children and Youth Affairs Katherine Zappone being appointed as UN special envoy for freedom of expression, it was revealed that Zappone approached Minister for Foreign Affairs Simon Coveney to offer herself for the position before her appointment was made.
- 29 July
  - President Michael D. Higgins sent a message of congratulations after Fintan McCarthy and Paul O'Donovan won the men's lightweight double sculls final at the 2020 Summer Olympics.
  - The President also wrote to the Oireachtas to raise concerns about the volume of complex legislation he had been asked to consider in short periods of time.
- 30 July – Tánaiste Leo Varadkar and Minister for Tourism, Culture, Arts, Gaeltacht, Sport and Media Catherine Martin urged pubs and restaurants to continue to adhere to the guidance for indoor dining ahead of the bank holiday weekend, and reiterated that both the Digital COVID Certificate and the HSE Vaccination Card were acceptable proofs of immunity.

=== August ===
- 2 August
  - A male motorist in his 80s died following a road crash in Clogheen, County Tipperary.
  - The body of a man believed to be in his 50s was discovered in a south Dublin park.
- 3 August
  - Two people died after a bus struck a number of parked cars and hit a pedestrian in County Cork.
  - Taoiseach Micheál Martin stated that a deal had been completed to secure 700,000 Pfizer COVID-19 vaccines from Romania.
  - Chief Medical Officer Tony Holohan warned that virus outbreaks were originating through symptomatic people attending workplaces, eating out and visiting friends, and urged symptomatic people to stay at home, even if vaccinated.
- 4 August
  - Political pressure was mounting on former Minister for Children Katherine Zappone after she organised an outdoor 50-person event at the Merrion Hotel in Dublin on 21 July and stated that she was "assured" by the hotel that the event was "in compliance with Government COVID-19 restrictions and guidelines". Zappone ultimately declined her UN role after the appointment process was criticised.
  - Met Éireann issued a Status Yellow thunderstorm warning for Ireland.
  - Laois County Council refused to grant a licence to hold the 2021 Electric Picnic music festival following the most up-to-date public health advice made available to the council from the Health Service Executive.
- 5 August
  - A video emerged online appearing to show multiple breaches of COVID-19 regulations at the pub owned by Independent TD Danny Healy-Rae in Kilgarvan, County Kerry, with young people gathering in the pub wearing no masks, with no social distancing and with access to the bar.
  - 34-year-old Daniel Murtagh was found guilty and sentenced to life imprisonment for the murder of 30-year-old Nadine Lott, his former partner, in County Wicklow in 2019.
- 6 August
  - In the wake of the Merrion Hotel controversy, Fáilte Ireland updated its hospitality guidelines to allow customers book multiple tables and host outdoor gatherings with live music for up to 200 people.
  - Speaking on RTÉ News: Six One, Tánaiste Leo Varadkar expressed his regret for attending the Merrion Hotel event, but said it was not in breach of Government regulations, and "probably" not in breach of Fáilte Ireland guidelines.
  - Around 88 kg of heroin, worth more than €12 million, was seized by Revenue at Rosslare Port.
  - In the 2021 Munster abuse case, five members of a family were convicted on a range of charges including the rape, sexual assault and exploitation of five children after a trial at the Central Criminal Court.
  - Following a meeting of the Cabinet COVID-19 sub-committee, it was announced that the Government would publish a roadmap by the end of August for the easing or ending of remaining COVID-19 restrictions.
  - Gardaí began preliminary inquiries into an indoor gathering at the pub owned by Independent TD Danny Healy-Rae.
- 8 August – Kellie Harrington was awarded an Olympic gold medal for her lightweight boxing final win in Tokyo.
- 9 August – The 2021 All-Ireland Senior Football Championship semi-final between Kerry and Tyrone was postponed to 15 August due to COVID-19 issues in the camp of the Ulster champions, while the final was postponed to 4 September.
- 10 August – Olympic gold medallist Kellie Harrington, bronze medallist Aidan Walsh and the remaining Irish Olympians returned home to Ireland.
- 11 August
  - Gardaí appealed for information after a 25-year-old man died following a stabbing in Tallaght in Dublin.
  - The HSE launched its portal for people to list their close contacts to enable faster contact tracing.
  - The COVID-19 vaccine registration portal opened to people aged 12 to 15 for the Pfizer or Moderna vaccines.
- 12 August
  - A man in his 30s and a woman in her 20s were arrested on suspicion of murder following the death of a four-year-old boy in Limerick in March.
  - The Chief Executive of the HSE Paul Reid said the vaccination programme was in "the final leg" after more than 50,000 people aged 12 to 15 registered to receive the COVID-19 vaccine, with 90% of adults partially vaccinated and 80% fully vaccinated.
- 13 August – A 26-year-old man was charged with the murder of 25-year-old Ademola Giwa in Tallaght, Dublin, on 11 August.
- 14 August – Irish Olympic hero Jack Woolley was hospitalised after being badly beaten up in Dublin on the night of 13 August.
- 15 August – Following Tyrone's withdrawal from the 2021 All-Ireland Senior Football Semi-Final, the GAA confirmed in a statement that the semi-final would be postponed to Saturday 28 August, with the final subsequently postponed to 11 September.
- 18 August
  - In the wake of the 2021 Taliban offensive, the Department of Foreign Affairs confirmed that it was helping 25 Irish citizens and eight dependents leave Afghanistan.
  - Ireland received its largest ever weekly shipment of COVID-19 vaccines, with over 540,000 doses delivered to the HSE, including the first batch of unwanted vaccines from the Romanian Government.
  - The Lord Mayor of Dublin Alison Gilliland said more Gardaí would patrol the city centre following reports of anti-social behaviour and after the random attack of Irish Olympian Jack Woolley.
- 19 August
  - Two men died following a collision involving three vehicles in County Meath.
  - HSE CEO Paul Reid said it was never too late to register to receive a COVID-19 vaccine, urging those who had not yet received a vaccine to come forward, as latest figures showed that over 120,000 people aged 12 to 15 had registered for a vaccine.
  - Following a meeting of the Government Committee on COVID-19, it was revealed that a roadmap for the phased reopening of all remaining closed industries, including the live entertainment and arts sector, would be published on 31 August.
- 20 August
  - A couple and an infant were among four people killed in a three-vehicle collision on the M6 near Ballinasloe, County Galway on the evening of 19 August.
  - Gardaí and the Road Safety Authority issued an appeal to all roads users to take greater care following the deaths of six people on Irish roads in the space of 24 hours.
- 21 August
  - An 18-year-old man was arrested after a 20-year-old male passenger died in a single-vehicle crash in County Limerick. The 20-year-old male passenger was killed, just hours before he was due to be married.
  - A man in his mid-20s was arrested after he allegedly attacked a shop owner with a glass bottle taken from the shelf of the business before he tried to take cash from the till.
- 22 August
  - Limerick won the 2021 All-Ireland Senior Hurling Championship Final against Cork.
  - HSE CEO Paul Reid said the threat from COVID-19 was still "very real", with the number of patients being treated in hospitals with COVID-19 at its highest level since the end of March, increasing to 314.
- 23 August
  - Six Irish people were airlifted off Sweden's highest mountain, Kebnekaise, after being stranded overnight.
  - Following crowds of people gathering after the All-Ireland Hurling Final on 22 August, Gardaí began investigating alleged breaches of COVID-19 regulations at a pub near Croke Park, while several pubs were temporarily shut by Gardaí due to anti-social behaviour and a lack of social distancing.
  - Music industry representatives criticised the Government after 40,000 people were allowed to attend the All-Ireland Senior Hurling Final at Croke Park, while the live entertainment industry remained closed, with representatives from a number of live event and music industry groups stating that the Taoiseach and Foreign Affairs Minister's attendance at the final was a "blatant disregard" for the live events industry.
  - Visitors to University Hospital Galway were being asked to come only if "absolutely necessary" as the hospital dealt with a COVID-19 outbreak and record numbers at its emergency department.
- 24 August
  - Minister for Health Stephen Donnelly said the Government would continue to ease COVID-19 restrictions "as quickly as possible" and that all remaining COVID-19 restrictions would be eased before Christmas.
  - Chief Medical Officer Tony Holohan warned of an "extremely high incidence" of the disease in Ireland and that mask wearing in public places had decreased, while the Chair of the NPHET Irish Epidemiological Modelling Advisory Group Philip Nolan said the peak of the fourth wave could be reached in September.
  - A woman in her 60s died following a collision between a car and a truck in Longford.
- 25 August
  - The husband of a woman who died with COVID-19 after giving birth to their daughter urged anyone who was unsure about receiving the COVID-19 vaccine to get the vaccine.
  - A row over the return to school of teachers in early stages of pregnancy intensified after the three teacher unions condemned the Minister for Education and the Department of Education for the "failure to provide alternative time-bound working arrangements for teachers who have been ineligible to receive vaccines."
  - A 31-year-old man was charged with the attempted murder of his mother at their family home in Innishannon, in County Cork in June.
- 26 August
  - In a letter to the Government, the NPHET recommended that there should be no widespread further easing of COVID-19 restrictions until 90% of over 16-year-olds were fully vaccinated.
  - Ellen Keane won Ireland's first medal of the 2020 Paralympic Games in Tokyo, claiming gold in the SB8 100m breaststroke.
- 27 August
  - A 29-year-old man died in a car crash in County Louth.
  - Gardaí launched an investigation following the discovery of the body of a teenager in Meath.
- 28 August
  - Gardaí launched a murder investigation following the death of a 19-year-old man who sustained a gunshot wound at a house in County Meath on 27 August.
  - Cyclists Katie-George Dunlevy and Eve McCrystal claimed a silver medal for Ireland in the B 3,000m individual pursuit at the 2020 Tokyo Paralympics.
  - Taoiseach Micheál Martin refused to confirm or deny reports that the NPHET would be disbanded following a report from the Irish Independent.
- 29 August
  - Ireland's Jason Smyth won gold for the sixth time after a dramatic T13 100m final at the Paralympic Games in Tokyo.
  - Gardaí seized €1.3m worth of cannabis following a search operation in County Meath.
  - A cyclist in his 50s died in a collision involving a car and a bicycle in County Galway.
- 30 August
  - Nicole Turner won silver in the S6 50m butterfly, taking home Ireland's fourth medal of the Paralympic Games.
  - A man in his 50s was arrested after two men were injured in a stabbing incident in Carlow.
  - Dublin Airport issued an apology after significant delays caused 118 passengers to miss their flights on 29 August.
  - Chief Medical Officer Tony Holohan advised parents to exercise caution in relation to after-school activities as children began to return to classrooms across the country.
  - Cork University Maternity Hospital publicly apologised to the husband and family of a mother-of-three who died alongside her newborn baby boy after she fell out of a hospital bed after apparently suffered a seizure.
  - Tributes were paid to a student and skilled sportsman in his 20s who died after he was struck by a car while holidaying in Greece.
- 31 August
  - The Government announced a further reopening plan for the country, with all remaining COVID-19 restrictions to be eased by 22 October, including the two-metre social distancing rule depending on the requirement of individual sectors, while masks would still be required in the health and retail sectors and on public transport.
  - New figures from the CSO showed that the country's population was estimated to stand at 5.01 million in April, marking the first time the population had risen above five million since the 1851 census.
  - Ireland's Katie-George Dunlevy and Eve McCrystal won gold in the women's road time trial B at the Fuji International Speedway in Tokyo, while Gary O'Reilly won bronze in the men's road time trial H5.

=== September ===
- 1 September
  - Public transport began operating at 100% capacity across the country as the Government's plan for easing most COVID-19 restrictions by 22 October began, while the GAA announced that an additional 1,150 tickets would be available with 41,150 people allowed to attend the All-Ireland football final on 11 September.
  - Taoiseach Micheál Martin announced that NPHET would cease to exist as a separate body over time and that their role and the vaccine taskforce would be transitioned into the normal functions of the Department of Health and the HSE.
  - Under changes to the COVID-19 vaccination programme, NIAC recommended that pregnant women could be offered an mRNA COVID-19 vaccine at any stage of pregnancy and that immunocompromised individuals aged 12 and older could receive a third additional vaccine dose.
  - The organisers of the Electric Picnic officially cancelled the 2021 music festival.
- 2 September – The Government launched a housing strategy underpinned by €4 billion in guaranteed State funding annually for the next five years.
- 3 September
  - Katie-George Dunlevy and Eve McCrystal won their second gold medal of the 2020 Tokyo Paralympics in the women's road race B event.
  - Over 61,000 students received their Leaving Certificate exam results with grades significantly higher compared to 2020, with the number of students achieving H1s in some popular subjects rising by more than 7 percentage points.
- 4 September
  - The eighth National Services Day has been marked with ceremonies around the country.
  - According to the Health Protection Surveillance Centre (HPSC), four cases of the new Mu COVID-19 variant, first discovered in Colombia, had been identified in Ireland.
- 5 September
  - Tánaiste Leo Varadkar faced criticism after a photograph emerged on social media showing him at the Mighty Hoopla music festival in London on the same weekend the Electric Picnic was cancelled due to the Government's COVID-19 restrictions.
  - During a major operation carried out by Gardaí targeting the gang behind the ransomware attack on the Health Service Executive (HSE), the Garda National Cyber Crime Bureau seized several domains used in the cyberattack and other ransomware attacks.
- 6 September
  - Organised indoor and outdoor events and mass gatherings returned and live music and dancing were permitted at weddings, as the further easing of COVID-19 restrictions took place.
  - The HSE estimated that between 10,000 and 12,000 children were restricting their movements as a result of being designated a close contact of a COVID-19 case.
  - Documents released showed that Katherine Zappone was told of her impending appointment to a UN role by the Minister for Foreign Affairs more than four months before the matter was agreed by Cabinet.
  - All clean plastic packaging waste including soft plastic could now be placed in Irish household recycling bins.
- 8 September
  - The number of children restricting their movements as a result of being designated a close contact of a COVID-19 case increased to 16,000, after more than 100 schools contacted the HSE over cases among pupils.
  - Minister for Health Stephen Donnelly announced an update to Ireland's COVID-19 vaccination programme, with residents aged 65 years and older living in long term residential care facilities and people aged 80 years and older living in the community to receive a booster dose of an mRNA COVID-19 vaccine.
  - Gardaí in County Kerry began a criminal investigation into a fatal firearms incident at a domestic residence near Lixnaw, where the bodies of three family members were discovered on the night of 7 September.
- 10 September – Latest figures showed that 90% of adults in Ireland were fully vaccinated against COVID-19, while the seven-millionth dose was administered.
- 11 September – Tyrone won the 2021 All-Ireland Senior Football Championship Final against Mayo.
- 12 September – Galway won the 2021 All-Ireland Senior Camogie Championship Final against Cork.
- 14 September – The remains of Baby John, one of the Kerry Babies, were exhumed by Gardaí at Holy Cross Cemetery, Caherciveen, County Kerry.
- 15 September
  - It was revealed that Ireland was to donate up to two million COVID-19 vaccines to developing countries.
  - The Government won its motion of confidence, tabled by Sinn Féin, in Minister for Foreign Affairs Simon Coveney by a majority of 92 to 59, with the support of TDs in the Independent Group and Regional Independent group.
  - Fianna Fáil TD Marc MacSharry resigned from the parliamentary party and voted no confidence in Minister Coveney.
  - President Michael D. Higgins declined an invitation to attend a church service at St Patrick's Cathedral in Armagh on 21 October to mark the 100th anniversary of the partition of Ireland and the centenary of Northern Ireland. The decision was critiicsed by unionist politicians.
  - The 2021 National Ploughing Championships went ahead in Ratheniska, County Laois on a much scaled-back level, with the trade exhibition element and the world ploughing contest cancelled due to uncertainty over COVID-19 restrictions.
- 16 September – The Higher Education Minister Simon Harris denied leaking the appointment of Katherine Zappone as a UN envoy and said he was "very seriously" considering a complaint to the Dáil's disciplinary committee.
- 17 September
  - The President defended his decision not to attend a church service marking the centenary of Northern Ireland and did not intend to revisit the decision.
  - The Environmental Protection Agency confirmed that unsafe water entered the public drinking water supply at two water treatment plants in August, with 52 cases of illness confirmed, including bacteria linked to E. coli.
- 18 September
  - Minister for Housing, Local Government and Heritage Darragh O'Brien announced an audit of all water treatment plants following the revelation of problems at two water treatment plants in August.
  - Gardaí seized just under €130,000 worth of drugs and cash following the search of a home in Cork.
- 19 September
  - Several hundred of Ireland's Afghan community gathered at the GPO in Dublin to protest against the Taliban regime in Afghanistan.
  - Latest figures showed that over 90% of Irish people over the age of 16 were now fully vaccinated against COVID-19, the highest rate in the European Union.
- 20 September
  - Thousands of workers across the country began returning to their offices and places of work, as COVID-19 restrictions further eased with rules around organised indoor group activities being relaxed and limits on outdoor group activities for participants being removed.
  - A 16-year-old boy who raped a teenage girl in a field near a holiday resort in County Wexford in 2019 was sentenced to five years detention, while his 19-year-old brother, who was 17 at the time and also raped the girl, was sentenced to six years in prison.
- 23 September – Garda Commissioner Drew Harris said a number of Gardaí were under investigation after they continued to cancel 999 calls without going through the proper procedure, after it was revealed that a further 53 emergency calls were cancelled.
- 24 September – Students and young people protested for climate action across Dublin, Belfast, Cork and Galway.
- 25 September – Ireland's mandatory hotel quarantine system ended immediately following an announcement by Minister for Health Stephen Donnelly, with all countries removed from the list of "high-risk" countries for international travel.
- 26 September – Pelletstown railway station, Ireland's newest train station, was officially opened by Minister for Transport Eamon Ryan and Tánaiste Leo Varadkar in north Dublin.
- 27 September – It was revealed that an extra bank holiday in 2021 could generate up to €20 million in tourism revenue, while the Government planned to give frontline workers a bonus as a reward for their efforts during the COVID-19 pandemic.
- 28 September – According to the Bloomberg COVID-19 resilience ranking, Ireland was named the best country to be in for how it dealt with the pandemic and the rise of the Delta variant.
- 29 September – A 39-year-old Brazilian man was found guilty of the murder of his French wife in Dublin on 25 October 2017.
- 30 September – The Comptroller and Auditor General found there were not enough checks carried out by the Department of Social Protection when people applied for the COVID-19 Pandemic Unemployment Payment in 2020, with 9.4% of claimants not eligible.
  - IT systems at NUI Galway were put offline, after an attempted cyberattack, with all internet traffic into and out of the university blocked.

=== October ===
- 1 October
  - No positive COVID-19 tests were reported at a pilot nightclub event in Dublin on 30 September, with the promotors stating they felt it was very successful.
  - A new report published by the CSO revealed that nurses and midwives were most likely to contract COVID-19 during the first wave in March 2020 with sales and retail assistants and checkout operators the workers most likely to contract it in the second and third waves.
  - Electric Ireland announced its second price increase for residential customers in 2021, becoming the latest energy provider to raise prices.
  - Ireland's newest technological university, Technological University of the Shannon: Midlands Midwest, spanning six campuses across Limerick, Clare, Tipperary and Westmeath formally opened.
- 2 October
  - In a video message on Twitter, Chief Medical Officer Tony Holohan said that the number of COVID-19 cases had "stabilised".
  - The first cartons of goat's milk came off the line at the Glenisk plant in County Offaly, following a fire which caused extensive damage to its facility.
  - Two men in their 40s were arrested following an alleged stabbing in County Longford.
- 3 October – Gardaí attended a protest outside the home of Chief Medical Officer Tony Holohan.
- 4 October
  - 34-year-old Daniel Murtagh was given the mandatory life sentence for the murder of Nadine Lott in December 2019.
  - A man in his 20s died, a woman in her 20s was injured and a man in his 30s was arrested, following a single-vehicle road crash in Ballyfermot in Dublin.
  - The Government signed off on the National Development Plan – Project Ireland 2040 – which would commit to expenditure on capital projects totalling more than €165 billion.
  - A man in his 40s died and two people were in a serious condition in hospital after an assault in a house in Blanchardstown in west Dublin.
- 5 October
  - The Chair of NPHET's Epidemiological Modelling Advisory Group Philip Nolan said that the Irish population was in a good place in relation to easing the remaining restrictions by 22 October.
  - A six-year-old boy who was deprived of oxygen at his birth was awarded €18 million in settlement of his High Court action against the National Maternity Hospital.
  - Gardaí were searching for a convicted drug dealer and gunman who escaped from an open prison on the night of 4 October.
- 7 October – The Government announced that it would send two representatives (Minister for Foreign Affairs Simon Coveney and Chief Whip Jack Chambers) to a ceremony in Armagh marking the centenary of Northern Ireland, after the President declined an invitation to the event in September.
- 8 October
  - Doors officially closed for the last time at 88 Bank of Ireland branches around the country.
  - Several thousand homeowners affected by mica marched through Dublin city centre.
  - A further 2,002 cases of COVID-19 were reported. Deputy Chief Medical Officer Ronan Glynn said the case numbers reflected an increased number of positive tests collected over the previous three days.
- 10 October
  - A woman in her 20s was arrested as part of an investigation into a hit-and-run incident in Limerick in which four people were injured, one seriously.
  - HSE CEO Paul Reid said the number of people in ICU with COVID-19 had risen by 20% in one week, with 67% of the ICU patients not vaccinated and 3% partially vaccinated.
- 11 October
  - The number of patients being treated in hospital with COVID-19 increased to 400, the highest since 8 March, while HSE Chief Clinical Officer Colm Henry revealed that up to 50,000 adults over the age of 40 were not yet vaccinated.
  - Gardaí investigating the disappearance of Deirdre Jacob and other women who went missing in Leinster over 20 years ago said a new search had begun because of unusual activity noticed on the evening she disappeared.
  - A woman was remanded in custody after she was charged in connection with a road crash in Limerick on 10 October, which left a man in a critical condition and three women with injuries.
  - A 19-year-old Waterford woman made history as she took over Taoiseach Micheál Martin's office to mark International Day of the Girl.
- 12 October
  - Minister for Finance Paschal Donohoe and Minister for Public Expenditure and Reform Michael McGrath announced Budget 2022.
  - Gardaí issued a Child Rescue Ireland Alert to trace missing two-year-old Aoife Haynes Murphy and said they had serious concerns about her welfare.
  - The Road Safety Authority warned road users of the dangers posed by fog with dense fog forecast across Leinster and Munster.
- 13 October
  - A further 2,066 cases of COVID-19 were reported. Deputy Chief Medical Officer Ronan Glynn said there were still 300,000 adults who had not been vaccinated and that two out of every three people in ICU were unvaccinated.
  - Taoiseach Micheál Martin said he could not guarantee that the removal of COVID-19 restrictions on 22 October would proceed as planned and that the trajectory of the virus had taken a wrong turn with a sudden increase in case numbers, while Minister for Health Stephen Donnelly said he was self-isolating after experiencing mild symptoms.
  - Garda Commissioner Drew Harris set up an investigation to examine the handling of cases where allegations of domestic or sexual abuse had been made against members of the Gardaí.
  - Police in Georgia detained five people in connection with the death of 28-year-old Tom Kennedy from Mayo, who was recovered from a river near the eastern city of Gori on 7 October.
- 16 October
  - A further 2,180 cases of COVID-19 were reported, the highest number of confirmed cases recorded in a single day since January.
  - Gardaí in Cork began an investigation after a 25-year-old man was seriously injured in a shooting incident in the city on the night of 15 October.
  - The Department of Foreign Affairs provided consular assistance following the death of a 24-year-old Irish man in Spain, who died from drowning in a swimming pool.
- 18 October
  - NPHET urged the Government to pause the easing of restrictions on Friday 22 October, with social distancing, mask-wearing and vaccine certificates to remain, while the NIAC approved vaccine boosters for people aged 60 and over.
  - A primary school in County Wexford closed until after the mid-term break in November after 34 cases of COVID-19 were detected at the school.
- 19 October
  - A further 2,399 cases of COVID-19 were reported, the highest number of confirmed cases recorded in a single day since 22 January.
  - The Government published a revised plan for the easing of restrictions on 22 October, with nightclubs allowed to reopen, the return of normal trading hours in pubs and restaurants, no attendance limits on weddings and religious ceremonies and 100% capacity allowed at sporting venues, while the continued use of masks, vaccine certificates and social distancing measures would remain in place until at least February 2022.
  - A primary school in County Wicklow closed over concerns at a high incidence of COVID-19 at the school.
  - The Government approved a new Road Traffic Bill which legislates, for the first time, the use of e-scooters and e-bikes on Irish roads.
- 21 October – Updated guidelines for hospitality and for the reopening of nightclubs on 22 October were published, with nightclubs allowed to operate at 100% capacity, a maximum of 1,500 people permitted to dance or stand at live music venues and multiple table bookings allowed in pubs and restaurants.
- 22 October
  - A further 2,466 cases of COVID-19 were reported, the highest number of confirmed cases recorded in a single day since 21 January.
  - Nightclubs and late venues reopened after almost 600 days of closure, as new guidelines were published.
  - A woman in her early 20s was seriously injured after being struck in the face by a firework in Galway's Eyre Square.
  - A 39-year-old man was sentenced to life in prison for the murder of his wife at their home in Dublin in 2017.
- 25 October
  - A woman in her 20s was in a serious condition in Beaumont Hospital following a hit-and-run in north Dublin on the night of 24 October.
  - Gardaí appealed for witnesses after a man in his 40s was also in a serious condition in University Hospital Galway following a hit-and-run in County Galway.
  - The Climate Change Advisory Council finalised two five-year carbon budgets which seek to reduce Ireland's greenhouse gas emissions by 51% within a decade.
  - The HSE announced that pop-up vaccination clinics at maternity hospitals would be developed, after it was revealed that 20 pregnant or postpartum women needed intensive care treatment for COVID-19 since the end of June 2021.
- 27 October
  - A woman in her 30s was arrested after two men were injured in stabbings in Dublin on the night of 26 October.
  - Met Éireann issued a Status Orange rain warning for Waterford, Wexford and Wicklow with seven other counties under a Status Yellow warning.
- 28 October
  - The HSE began to send antigen tests to people who were deemed close contacts of a COVID-19 case.
  - A woman was seriously injured after being struck by a Luas near Heuston Station in Dublin.
  - The Health Protection Surveillance Centre confirmed the first two flu cases of the season in Ireland.
- 30 October
  - A further 2,966 cases of COVID-19 were reported, the highest number of confirmed cases recorded in a single day since 16 January.
  - A man in his 40s died following a road crash in County Clare.
- 31 October
  - A woman in her 50s died after she was struck by a car in Drimnagh, Dublin.
  - Met Éireann issued a series of Status Yellow wind warnings across the country, with gusts of up to 90 to 110 km/h forecast.

=== November ===
- 1 November – Following new advice from the National Immunisation Advisory Committee, Minister for Health Stephen Donnelly authorised the use of booster vaccines for healthcare staff.
- 2 November
  - A further 3,726 cases of COVID-19 were reported.
  - A ceremony was held in Dublin to remember the lives of people lost during the COVID-19 pandemic.
  - Student nurses from around the country were joined by their colleagues outside the Dáil as they held a protest calling for Government support.
  - A cyclist in his 40s died following a road crash in Ranelagh, Dublin.
- 4 November
  - Gardaí arrested a 32-year-old man and began a murder investigation after the body of a 32-year-old woman was discovered in her home in Dublin.
  - The Government published its Climate Action Plan which aims to reduce greenhouse gas emissions by 51% by the year 2030.
- 5 November
  - A further 3,903 cases of COVID-19 were reported.
  - The HSE began rolling out COVID-19 booster vaccines for those aged 60 and over.
  - 17 people were arrested following an investigation into suspected COVID-19 social welfare fraud at a number of business premises in Dublin.
- 6 November
  - 32-year-old Diego Costa Silva was charged with the murder of his wife Fabiole Camara De Campos in their home in Finglas, Dublin on 4 November.
  - Minister for the Environment, Climate and Communications Eamon Ryan cancelled his trip to the COP26 conference in Glasgow, after testing positive for COVID-19.
- 7 November – It was confirmed that Minister for the Environment, Climate and Communications Eamon Ryan tested negative for COVID-19 after taking a second test and would now travel to COP26.
- 8 November
  - Three men were found guilty of abducting and torturing businessman Kevin Lunney in September 2019, while a fourth man was found not guilty.
  - Minister of State for Public Health, Well Being and National Drugs Strategy Frank Feighan tested positive for COVID-19.
- 10 November – Tributes were paid to a 13-year-old boy who died after he was struck in the head by a sliotar at his school in Kilkenny.
- 11 November – A 14-year-old became Ireland's youngest person to die with COVID-19.
- 12 November
  - A further 5,483 cases of COVID-19 were reported, while NPHET recommended to Government that people who frequently go to nightclubs, bars and restaurants should take twice weekly antigen tests, extending the use of COVID certificates to areas outside of hospitality, mask-wearing in outdoor sporting events and that people work from home.
  - Gardaí began an investigation after a man in his late 20s was found seriously injured with a gunshot wound to the head in Finglas, Dublin on the night of 11 November.
  - Ennis was awarded the title of Ireland's tidiest town.
- 16 November – The Government announced a series of measures in a bid to curb the spread of COVID-19, with a closing time for bars, restaurants and nightclubs to be midnight, household contacts of a person with COVID-19 to restrict movements for five days and take three antigen tests, people required to work from home where possible and vaccination certificates required for cinemas and theatres.
- 20 November – A further 5,959 cases of COVID-19 were reported.
- 25 November – Gardaí began a murder investigation after a 65-year-old man died with serious head and body injuries in Balbriggan on 24 November.
- 26 November
  - Minister for Health Stephen Donnelly announced that COVID-19 booster vaccines would be offered to everyone aged 16 and over, starting with pregnant women aged over 16, those aged 40 to 49 and those aged 16 to 39, following new recommendations from NIAC.
  - The 2021 edition of The Late Late Toy Show aired, marking the 13th hosted by Ryan Tubridy and the 46th edition overall.
- 27 November
  - The NPHET Epidemiological Modelling Advisory Group began meeting to monitor the Omicron variant situation in Europe, and began considering further required measures.
  - Thousands of people attended a protest against COVID-19 restrictions and vaccine passports at the GPO on Dublin's O'Connell Street.
- 28 November – Phase 2 of the BusConnects transport infrastructure programme was launched in Dublin.
- 29 November – Minister for Health Stephen Donnelly said it was likely that the new Omicron variant was in Ireland after the Department of Health confirmed that 11 suspected cases of the new variant were sent for whole genome sequencing.
- 30 November – The Government announced additional measures in a bid to curb the spread of COVID-19, with parents of children aged 12 and under urged to reduce socialisation indoors, a negative test required for people arriving into Ireland from Friday 3 December, the re-establishment of mandatory hotel quarantine, the wearing of face coverings for children aged 9 years and over on public transport, in retail and for children in third class and above.

=== December ===
- 1 December – Tests carried out at the National Virus Reference Laboratory confirmed that the first case of the Omicron variant had been detected in Ireland.
- 3 December – The Government reintroduced a series of measures that would commence from 7 December to 9 January amid concerns of the Omicron variant, with nightclubs to close, bars and restaurants to revert to six adults per table and no multiple table bookings allowed, indoor cultural and sporting events to operate at 50% capacity, a maximum of four households allowed to meet indoors, the Pandemic Unemployment Payment to be reinstated and the requirement of vaccination certificates extended to gyms, leisure centres and hotel bars.
- 5 December – Status Orange and Yellow wind warnings were issued for the country by Met Éireann ahead of the arrival of Storm Barra.
- 6 December – Met Éireann issued Status Red wind warnings for Kerry, Cork and Clare, as the country braced for Storm Barra to batter Ireland with gusts expected to reach 140 km/h, while the Department of Education advised schools in counties with Status Red and Orange weather warnings to close.
- 7 December – Around 65,000 homes and businesses were without power in Cork and Kerry, as Storm Barra battered Ireland with gusts of up to 160 km/h, causing fallen trees, flooding and disruption to transport. Schools in counties with Status Red and Orange weather warnings were advised to remain closed.
- 9 December – Chief Medical Officer Tony Holohan announced in a statement that five additional cases of the Omicron variant had been detected, bringing to six the total number of cases that had been identified in Ireland following whole genome sequencing.
- 12 December – Four additional cases of the Omicron variant were detected, bringing to 10 the total number of cases that had been identified in Ireland following whole genome sequencing.
- 13 December
  - A 38-year-old double killer was sentenced to life in prison for the murder of his friend whose decapitated remains were found in a shallow grave in woods in 2016.
  - A man who used his car to repeatedly run over Irish boxing champion Kevin Sheehy was found guilty of his murder in 2019.
  - The Department of Health announced that eight additional cases of the Omicron variant had been detected, bringing to 18 the total number of cases that had been identified in Ireland following whole genome sequencing.
  - The NIAC recommended that people would be able to receive a booster dose three months after their second dose.
- 14 December – The Government signed off on a plan to assist households struggling with the rising cost of electricity bills in a €210 million scheme, with all domestic electricity customers to receive a once-off €100 credit.
- 15 December – The Department of Health announced that 24 additional cases of the Omicron variant had been detected, bringing to 42 the total number of Omicron cases identified in Ireland, while Chief Medical Officer Tony Holohan urged people to take precautions to avoid being in isolation for Christmas.
- 17 December – To curb the spread of COVID-19 over the Christmas period, the Government announced an 8 pm closing time for bars, restaurants, live events, cinemas and theatres that would commence from 20 December to 30 January.
- 18 December – Chief Medical Officer Tony Holohan called on the public to help flatten the curve after a further 7,333 cases of COVID-19 were reported, the highest number reported since early January.
- 19 December
  - Chief Medical Officer Tony Holohan announced that the Omicron variant was now the dominant variant in Ireland after it was confirmed that 52% of COVID-19 cases were now due to Omicron.
  - Minister for the Environment, Climate and Communications Eamon Ryan began self-isolating after testing positive for COVID-19.
  - A number of people were injured in Birr, County Offaly after a car driven by a teen suspected of drink-driving mounted a footpath.
- 21 December – 31-year-old Logan Jackson was sentenced to life in prison for the murder of 20-year-old Irish boxing champion Kevin Sheehy in Limerick in 2019.
- 22 December – Five people were injured in a multi-vehicle collision at Dublin Airport in which a truck collided with a number of buses and cars.
- 23 December
  - Chief Medical Officer Tony Holohan confirmed that almost 75% of cases were now due to the Omicron variant, after a further 7,411 cases of COVID-19 were reported.
  - Minister for Health Stephen Donnelly announced that booster vaccines would be offered to everyone aged 30 and over from 29 December and to all remaining age groups from 10 January.
  - Gardaí began an investigation after the bodies of an 88-year-old father and 50-year-old son were found at a house in a suspected murder-suicide in Letterkenny, County Donegal.
- 24 December
  - A further 11,182 cases of COVID-19, the highest daily number recorded in a single day since the pandemic began, were reported. 83% of cases were now due to the Omicron variant.
  - A man in his 40s was arrested after a 40-year-old woman died during an assault at a property in Enniskerry, County Wicklow.
- 25 December
  - A further 13,765 cases of COVID-19 were reported in a new daily record, overtaking the 11,182 cases announced on Christmas Eve.
  - A 51-year-old woman was in a serious condition in hospital after she was stabbed several times near her home in north county Cork.
- 27 December
  - Gardaí in Navan appealed for witnesses after a man in his 40s was injured in a stabbing in County Meath.
  - A man in his 20s died and a woman in her 50s were seriously injured in a two-vehicle collision in Wexford, while two people were killed in separate road traffic incidents in Dublin and Mayo, bringing to six the number of road fatalities on the island of Ireland in 24 hours.
- 29 December
  - A further 16,428 cases of COVID-19 were reported, overtaking the 13,765 cases announced on Christmas Day. Chief Medical Officer Tony Holohan expressed concern and stated that "every individual should consider themselves potentially infectious".
  - The Department of Foreign Affairs stated that lessons had been learned, after an image emerged showing at least 20 senior officials and staff from the department gathering at Iveagh House in breach of public health guidelines in June 2020.
- 30 December
  - A record 20,554 cases of COVID-19 were reported.
  - Chief Medical Officer Tony Holohan confirmed that 92% of cases were now due to the Omicron variant, while he urged people to keep social contacts low and not to hold household gatherings on New Year's Eve. Minister for Health Stephen Donnelly announced new advice on COVID-19 testing and the period of isolation.
- 31 December – Minister for Health Stephen Donnelly announced that booster vaccines would be offered to everyone aged 16 and over from 2 January 2022, eight days earlier than planned.

== Sport ==
=== Association football ===
International friendly matches

- 30 March – Qatar 1–1 Ireland
- 3 June – Andorra 1–4 Ireland
- 8 June – Hungary 0–0 Ireland
- 12 October – Ireland 4–0 Qatar

2022 World Cup qualification

- 24 March – Serbia 3–2 Ireland
- 27 March – Ireland 0–1 Luxembourg
- 1 September – Portugal 2–1 Ireland
- 4 September – Ireland 1–1 Azerbaijan
- 7 September – Ireland 1–1 Serbia
- 9 October – Azerbaijan 0–3 Ireland
- 11 November – Ireland 0–0 Portugal
- 14 November – Luxembourg 0–3

== Arts and literature ==
- Sligo band Those Nervous Animals, who formed in the late 1970s, finally released a debut studio album after more than 40 years together, which included their signature track The Business Enterprise (My Friend John)

== Deaths ==
=== January ===
- 1 January – Liam Reilly, 65, singer-songwriter, lead singer of Bagatelle
- 2 January – Michael McKevitt, 71, founder of the Real IRA, cancer
- 6 January – James Cross, 99, Irish-born British diplomat and kidnapping survivor (October Crisis), COVID-19.
- 7 January – Jim Townsend, 83, politician, county councillor and Senator
- 9 January – Barbara Hewson, 59, barrister, pancreatic cancer.
- 10 January – Theo English, 90, hurler (Marlfield, Tipperary senior team, Munster).
- 10/11 January – Michael Byrne, aka Old Man Belfield, 71/72, a homeless man who lived on the campus of University College Dublin for over 30 years.
- 11 January – Robert Warke, 90, Anglican prelate, Bishop of Cork, Cloyne and Ross (1988–1998).
- 14 January
  - Éamonn Ryan, 79, Gaelic footballer (Glenville, Watergrasshill, Imokilly, Cork senior team) and manager (Cork senior ladies' football team)
  - Brian Moller, 85, Anglican priest, Dean of Connor
- 16 January – David Shaw-Smith, 81, filmmaker
- 19 January – Brian Hillery, 83, politician, Senator and TD, short illness.
- 21 January – Jerry Kiernan, 67, Olympic long-distance runner, (1984)
- 23 January
  - Harry Perry, 86, Olympic boxer.
  - Roy Torrens, 72, cricket player and manager.
- 24 January – Patrick O'Donoghue, 86, Roman Catholic prelate, Bishop of Lancaster (2001–2009).
- 26 January – Cara O'Sullivan, 58, coloratura soprano, long illness.
- 29 January – Joe Pat Prunty, 88, Gaelic footballer (Roslea Shamrocks, Fermanagh junior team) and businessman, short illness. Born in Northern Ireland
- 30 January – Mick Kerr, 86, Gaelic footballer (Beragh Red Knights, Tyrone senior team). Born in Northern Ireland

=== February ===
- 2 February – John O'Keeffe, 95, Gaelic footballer (Millstreet, Cork senior team).
- 4 February
  - Harry Donnelly, 83, Gaelic footballer (Athlone, Offaly senior team).
  - Ben Hannigan, 77, footballer (Shelbourne, Wrexham, Dundalk, Cork Celtic, Shamrock Rovers).
- 5 February – Edward Moore, 50, cricketer (national team).
- 7 February – Tommy Kenny, 87, ladies' Gaelic football administrator, President of the LGFA (1977–1979).
- 8 February – Rynagh O'Grady, 69, actress (Abbey Theatre, Father Ted).
- 9 February
  - Christy Ryan, 63, Gaelic footballer and hurler (St. Finbarr's, Cork senior teams, Munster), cancer.
  - Éamonn Breslin, 80, Gaelic footballer (Ballyfermot Gaels, Dublin senior team).
- 12 February – Tom Scullion, 81, Gaelic footballer (Bellaghy, Derry senior team) and manager (Derry senior team).
- 18 February – Mark van Drumpt, sports physiotherapist (Garryowen, Limerick), cancer.
- 21 February – Joe Burke, 81, Irish button accordion player.
- 22 February
  - Martin Heffernan, 76, Gaelic footballer (Tullamore, Offaly senior team) and administrator.
  - Jack Quaid, 88, hurler (Feohanagh-Castlemahon, Limerick senior team, Munster).
- 23 February - Gary Halpin, 55, rugby union player (Wanderers F.C., Leinster, London Irish, Harlequins, national team), unexpectedly.
- 24 February
  - Tom Foley, 74, racehorse trainer, cancer.
  - Enda McDonagh, 90, Roman Catholic priest and academic.
- 26 February
  - Noel Elliott, 74, rugby union player (Dolphin R.F.C., Munster, national team), illness.
  - Des McAleenan, 53, association footballer (Connecticut Wolves, Albany Alleycats) and coach (New York Red Bulls, Colombia national team), suicide.
- 27 February - Mike Burns, 84, journalist (RTÉ News at One, This Week, World Report).

=== March ===
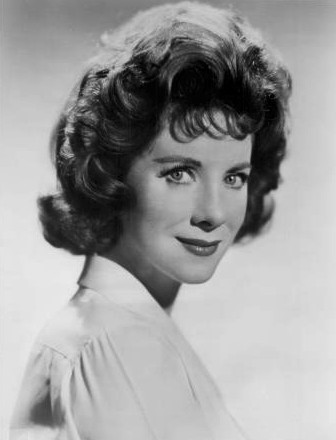
Carmel Quinn

- 2 March – Liam Carroll, 70, property developer and businessman.
- 6 March
  - Tom Moloughney, 80, hurler (Kilruane MacDonaghs, Tipperary senior team).
  - Carmel Quinn, 95, actress and singer.
  - Ned Cleary, 90, Gaelic football trainer and administrator (Castlehaven).
- 8 March – Fergal McCann, 47, Gaelic football coach (Killyclogher St Mary's, Carrickmore St Colmcille's, Tyrone senior team), long illness.
- 15 March – Alan Kane, 75, Gaelic footballer (Aodh Ruadh, St. Joseph's, Donegal senior team).
- 16 March – Jimmy Stafford, 77, Gaelic footballer (University College Dublin, Cavan senior team, Combined Universities).
- 22 March – P. J. McGrath, 79, Gaelic footballer (Mayo senior team), referee and administrator.
- 23 March – Noel Bridgeman, 74, drummer (Skid Row), cancer.
- 25 March – Jim Quaid, 88, hurler (Feohanagh-Castlemahon, Limerick senior team).

=== April ===
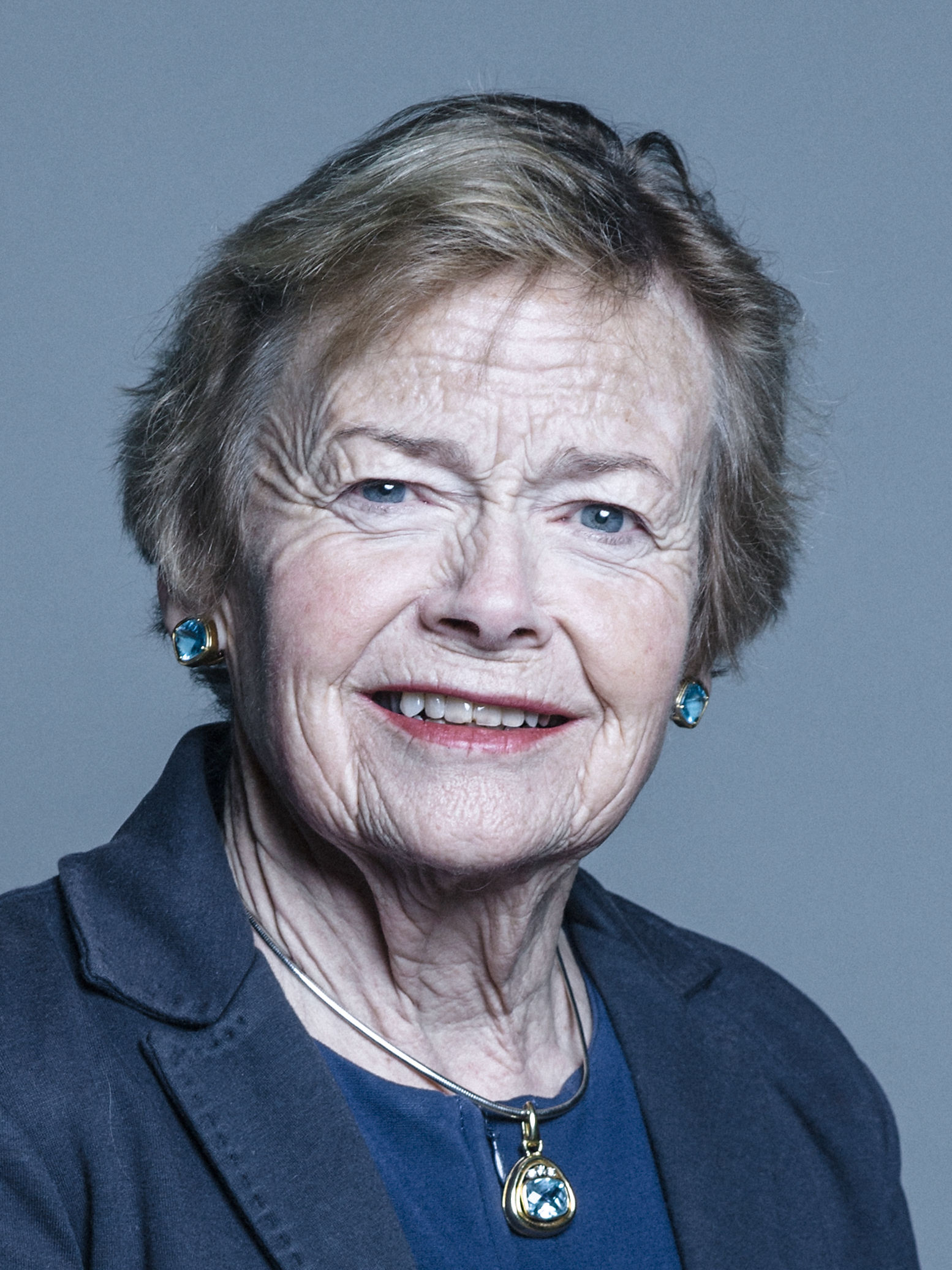
Detta Ó Catháin

- 5 April – Veronica Dunne, 93, opera singer and singing teacher.
- 6 April
  - Packy McGarty, 87, Gaelic footballer (Mohill, Leitrim senior team, Connacht).
  - Mattie Hetherton, 69, Gaelic footballer (Cavan senior team).
  - Tim F. Hayes, 74, Gaelic footballer (Clonakilty, Cork senior team, Munster).
  - Denis Donoghue, 92, literary critic.
- 9 April – Paddy Cahill, 44, filmmaker and cycling advocate.
- 10 April
  - Shay Healy, 78, broadcaster, journalist and songwriter, Parkinson's disease.
  - Lee Dunne, 86, author and playwright.
- 15 April – Tom Sailí Ó Flaithearta, 90, actor.
- 21 April – Gerry Mackey, 87, footballer (Shamrock Rovers, King's Lynn, Limerick, national team).
- 23 April – Detta Ó Catháin, Baroness Ó Catháin, 83, businesswoman and British life peer.
- 26 April – Austin Flynn, 87, hurler (Abbeyside, Waterford senior team, Munster).
- 27 April – Rory Young, 53, conservationist, gunshot wound.

=== May ===
- 1 May – Tom Hickey, 77, actor.
- 3 May
  - Alan Keely, 38, footballer (Shelbourne, Finn Harps, Waterford United).
  - Seán Corcoran, 74, singer and music collector.
- 4 May
  - Alan McLoughlin, 54, English-born footballer (Swindon Town, Southampton, Portsmouth, national team), cancer.
  - Kathleen Reynolds, 88, spouse of the Taoiseach (1992–1994).
  - William Westenra, 7th Baron Rossmore, 90, Anglo-Irish noble, photographer and author.
- 12 May
  - Séamus Deane, 81, poet, novelist and critic.
  - Dixie Hale, 85, footballer (Waterford, Shamrock Rovers, Swansea Town, Watford).
- 15 May – Tim Falvey, 87, politician.
- 23 May – Barney Curley, 81, horse trainer and punter (Yellow Sam betting coup).
- 25 May – Johnny Everard, 97, hurler and Gaelic footballer (Moyne-Templetuohy, Tipperary senior teams).
- 26 May – Vincent Daly, 72, Gaelic footballer (Longford senior team).
- 30 May – John Carpenter, 84, football referee.

=== June ===
- 3 June – Cathal Flynn, 87, Gaelic footballer (Leitrim senior team, Connacht).
- 7 June – John McDonnell, 82, athletics coach.
- 16 June – J. Peter Neary, 71, economist.
- 17 June – Mary Frances McDonald, 91, feminist and women's rights campaigner.
- 27 June – Noel Furlong, 83, businessman and poker player.
- 30 June – Barbara Murphy, 56, nephrologist.

=== July ===
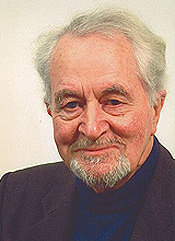
Desmond Fennell

- 4 July – Rick Laird, 80, jazz fusion bassist (Mahavishnu Orchestra, Brian Auger and the Trinity), lung cancer.
- 11 July – Charlie Gallagher, 80, Scottish-born footballer (Celtic, national team).
- 12 July – Seán McCarthy, 84, politician, TD (1981–1989), Minister of State for Science and Technology (1987–1989) and Senator (1989–1992).
- 13 July - Ronnie Kavanagh, 90, rugby union player (Wanderers F.C., Leinster, national team).
- 15 July - Joe Cassidy, 51, singer-songwriter (Butterfly Child), sepsis.
- 16 July
  - Desmond Fennell, 92, writer, essayist, cultural philosopher and linguist.
  - Finbarr Gantley, 70, hurler (Beagh, Galway senior team, Connacht).
- 17 July – Jo Jo Barrett, 77, Gaelic footballer (Austin Stacks, Kerry senior team) and manager (Austin Stacks, Clara, Wexford senior team).
- 18 July – Donal Sheehan, 81, hurler (Na Piarsaigh, Cork senior team).
- 19 July – Noel Lucey, 82, Gaelic footballer (Glenbeigh-Glencar, Laune Rangers, Kerry senior team).
- 21 July – Desmond O'Malley, 82, politician, TD (1968–2002) and leader of the Progressive Democrats (1985–1993).
- 27 July
  - Tommy Connolly, 74, footballer (Dundalk) and manager (Dundalk).
  - Ray McBride, 69, dancer and actor (Into the West, Angela's Ashes, Ballykissangel).

=== August ===
- 3 August – Noel Lynch, 74, politician, Member of the London Assembly (2003–2004).
- 8 August – Colum McKinstry, 71, Gaelic footballer (Clan na Gael, Armagh senior team, Ulster) and manager (Clan na Gael). Born in Northern Ireland.
- 14 August – James McCartan Sr., 83, Gaelic footballer (Glenn, Down senior team, Ulster) and manager (Down). Born in Northern Ireland.
- 24 August
  - Liam O'Brien, 72, hurler (James Stephens, Kilkenny senior team, Leinster).
  - P. J. Garvey, 50, Gaelic footballer and hurler (Hospital-Herbertstown, Limerick senior teams).
- 29 August
  - Pat Nolan, 84, hurler (Oylegate-Glenbrien, Wexford senior team, Leinster).
  - Rodney Rice, 76, journalist and broadcaster, short illness.
- 30 August – Seán McGuinness, 76, hurling manager (Antrim senior team, Down senior team, Ulster). Born in Northern Ireland.

=== September ===
- 4 September – Donncha Ó Dúlaing, 88, broadcaster.
- 11 September – Mick Flannelly, 91, hurler (Mount Sion, Waterford senior team, Munster).
- 15 September – Thomas Ryan, 92, artist.
- 18 September – Anto Finnegan, 48, Gaelic footballer (St. Paul's, Antrim senior team), motor neuron disease. Born in Northern Ireland.
- 23 September
  - Billa O'Connell, 91, entertainer.
  - Mervyn Taylor, 89, politician, TD (1981–1997), Minister for Labour (1993) and Minister for Equality and Law Reform (1993–1994 and 1994–1997).
- 24 September – Grey Ruthven, 2nd Earl of Gowrie, 81, Irish-born British politician, businessman, and arts administrator.
- 25 September – Paddy Prendergast, 95, Gaelic footballer (Dungloe, Ballintubber, Donegal senior team, Mayo senior team, Connacht).

=== October ===
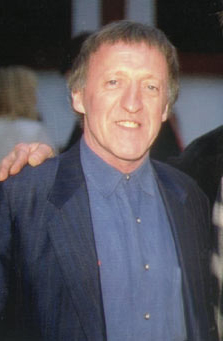
Paddy Moloney

- 8 October – Tony MacMahon, 82, button accordion player and broadcaster.
- 12 October – Paddy Moloney, 83, musician, composer, and producer (The Chieftains).
- 14 October – Gerry Robinson, 72, businessman and television executive.
- 16 October – Máire Mhac an tSaoi, 99, Irish language scholar, poet, writer, and academic.
- 17 October – Brendan Kennelly, 85, poet and academic.
- 24 October – John Traynor, 73, criminal, cancer.
- 27 October – Gay McIntyre, 88, jazz musician.
- 28 October – Davy Tweed, 61, rugby union player (Ballymena R.F.C., Ulster, national team), road traffic accident. Born in Northern Ireland.
- 31 October – Simon Young, 62, broadcaster, long illness.

=== November ===
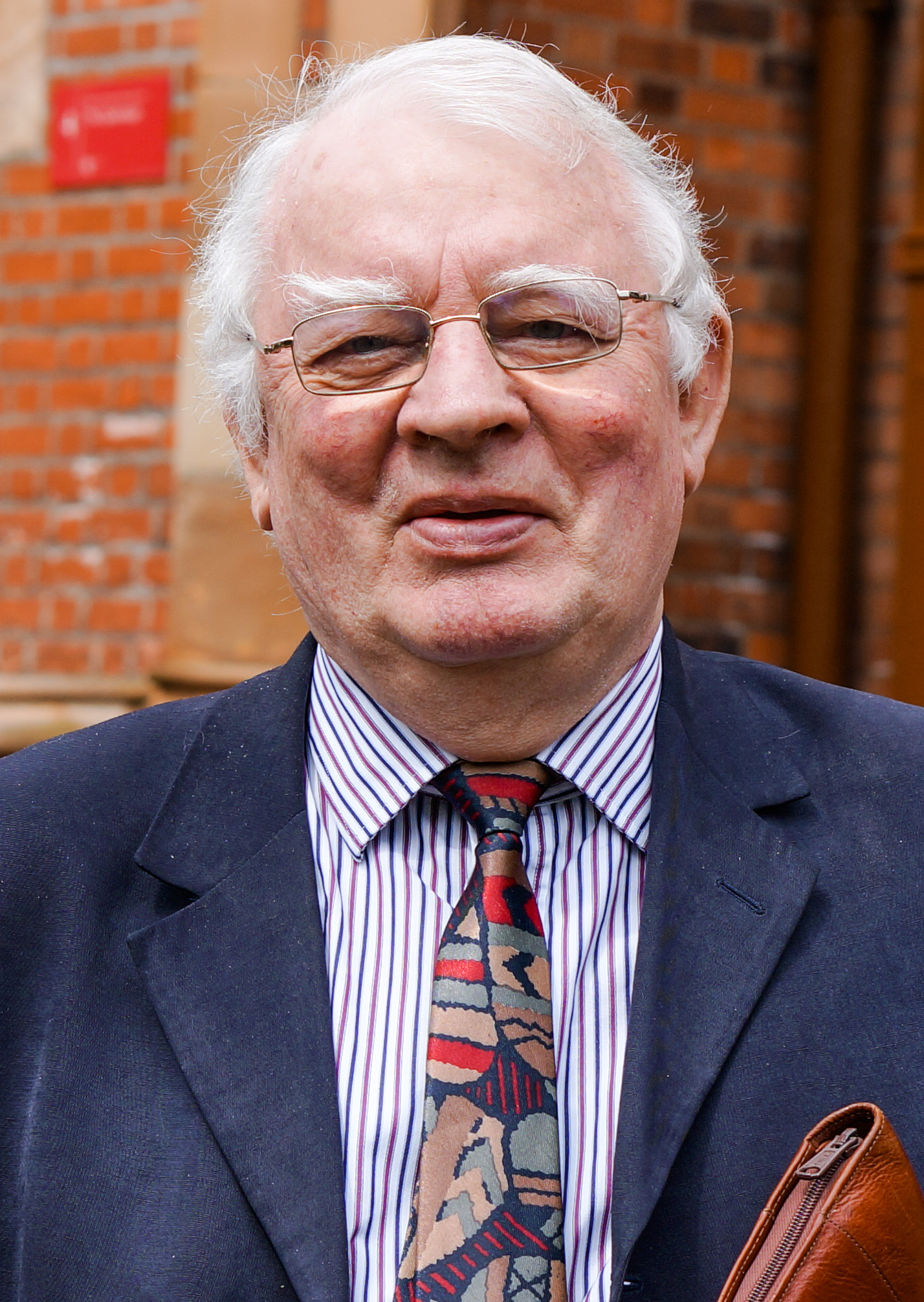
Austin Currie

- 1 November – Maurice Price, 83, association footballer (Shamrock Rovers) and coach (national team).
- 2 November
  - Des Ferguson, 91, Gaelic footballer and hurler (St Vincent's, Gaeil Colmcille, Dublin senior teams) and coach (Meath senior teams).
  - John Joe O'Hagan, 91, Gaelic footballer (Clonoe O'Rahilly's, Tyrone senior team) and manager (Eglish St Patrick's). Born in Northern Ireland.
  - Declan Mulligan, 83, rock musician, singer and songwriter.
- 8 November – Seán FitzPatrick, 73, banker and former chairman of Anglo-Irish Bank, heart attack.
- 9 November
  - Austin Currie, 82, politician, MP (1964–1972), TD (1989–2002) and Minister of State at the Department of Justice (1994–1997). Born in Northern Ireland.
  - John Kinsella, 89, composer.
- 18 November – George Eogan, 91, archaeologist.
- 20 November – Ray McLoughlin, 82, rugby union player (Gosforth, Barbarians, British & Irish Lions, national team).
- 22 November – Ned Rea, 77, hurler (Effin, Faughs, Limerick senior team, Munster).
- 26 November – Norman Allen, 93, Gaelic footballer and hurler (St. Vincent's, Dublin senior teams).
- 30 November
  - Barney Carr, 98, Gaelic footballer (Warrenpoint, Down senior team) and manager (Down).
  - Mary Maher, 81, American-born trade unionist, feminist, and journalist.

=== December ===
- 1 December
  - Seánie O'Leary, 69, hurler (Youghal, Cork senior team, Munster) and coach (Imokilly).
  - Jas Murphy, 98, Gaelic footballer (Kerins O'Rahilly's, Garda, Kerry senior team, Cork senior team, Munster).
- 2 December – Tom McGarry, 74, hurler (Treaty Sarsfields, Limerick senior team, Munster), footballer (Limerick) and rugby union player (Young Munster).
- 4 December – Andy McCabe, 76, Gaelic footballer (Crosserlough, Cavan senior team, Ulster).
- 12 December
  - Toddy O'Sullivan, 87, politician, TD (1981–1997) and Minister of State (1986–1987 and 1994–1997).
  - Martin Quinn, 83, Gaelic footballer (Kilbride, Meath senior team).
- 13 December – Liam Kavanagh, 86, politician, TD (1969–1997), MEP (1973–1981), Minister for Labour (1981–1982 and 1982–1983) and Minister for the Environment (1983–1986).
- 22 December
  - Thomas Kinsella, 93, poet.
  - Eddie Wallace, 71, footballer (Shelbourne, Galway, Drogheda United) and manager (Athlone Town).
- 24 December – Shirley Bottolfsen, 87, humanitarian activist.
- 26 December - Denis J. Hickie, 78, rugby union player (St Mary's College, Leinster, national team).
- 27 December
  - Jim Sherwin, 81, producer, broadcaster and sports commentator.
  - Patsy Dorgan, 85, footballer (Blackburn Rovers, Cork Hibernians, Cork Celtic).
- 28 December – Chris Wall, 79, politician, Senator (2007).

== See also ==
- Politics of the Republic of Ireland
