= World Report =

World Report may refer to:

- World Report (CBC), a Canadian news radio program,
- World Report (RTÉ), an Irish news radio program,
- World Report, a former name of CNN Newsroom
- U.S. News & World Report, an American news magazine.
