= Mike Burns (broadcaster) =

Irish journalist (1937–2021)

Mike Burns MBE
- Born: 17 January 1937; Leicester, England
- Died: 26 February 2021 (aged 84); Dublin, Ireland
- Occupations: Journalist, broadcaster
- Notable credit(s): RTÉ News at One, This Week, World Report

Michael Burns MBE (17 January 1937 – 27 February 2021) was a British-born Irish journalist who spent the majority of his career working with national broadcaster RTÉ. He has been described as "one of the most significant journalists in the history of Irish broadcasting."

== Career ==
Burns began his journalism career with the Sunday Independent, before joining RTÉ a year after the television service began. He began writing for the RTÉ Guide, but soon moved to the newsroom. Burns became RTÉ’s first Editor of News Features, launching the News at 1.30, World Report and This Week. By the time of his retirement he had moved to London and was working as RTÉ's London Editor. In 2004 Burns received an MBE in acknowledgment of his services to UK-Irish relations throughout his career.
