= Eddie Wallace =

Irish footballer (1950–2021)

Personal information
- Date of birth: 1950
- Place of birth: Dublin, Ireland
- Date of death: 22 December 2021 (aged 71)
- Place of death: Dublin, Ireland
- Position: Goalkeeper

Senior career*
Years	Team	Apps	(Gls)
- Shelbourne
- Galway
- Drogheda United

Managerial career
- 2014: Athlone Town (assistant)
- 2014–2015: Athlone Town
- * Club domestic league appearances and goals

Edward W. Wallace (1950 – 22 December 2021) was an Irish footballer and manager who played for several clubs in the League of Ireland before later becoming involved in team management and development.

== Career ==
Wallace enjoyed a brief playing career as a goalkeeper and played for Shelbourne, Galway and Drogheda United in the League of Ireland before reverting to the intermediate game with the St Francis club. He worked closely as a coach with Pat Devlin when Bray Wanderers entered the League of Ireland in 1985. He also worked with Pete Mahon at UCD and had spells assisting Bohemians, St Francis and St Patrick's Athletic in various positions. Wallace had a brief spell as manager at Athlone Town.

== Death ==
Wallace died after a period of illness on 22 December 2021, aged 71.
