= Anto Finnegan =

Antrim Gaelic footballer (c. 1973–2021)

Personal information
- Nickname: Anto
- Born: 1973 Belfast, Northern Ireland
- Died: 18 September 2021 (aged 48) Belfast, Northern Ireland

Sport
- Sport: Gaelic football
- Position: Centre-back
Club
- Years: Club
- St Paul's
Club titles
- Antrim titles: 3
Inter-county
- Years: County
- 1994–2005: Antrim
Inter-county titles
- Ulster titles: 0
- All-Irelands: 0
- NFL: 0
- All Stars: 0

Anthony Finnegan (c. 1973 – 18 September 2021) was a Gaelic footballer who played for the St Paul's club and also at senior level for the Antrim county team. Finnegan usually lined out as a defender.

== Playing career ==
Finnegan first came to Gaelic football prominence at juvenile and underage levels with the St Paul's club in Belfast. He eventually progressed onto the club's senior team and won three County Championship titles. Finnegan lined out with the Antrim senior football team for over a decade, the highlights of which were an All-Ireland B Championship win over Fermanagh in 1999 when he was captain and an Ulster Championship win over Down the following year.

== Personal life and death ==
Finnegan was diagnosed with motor neuron disease in August 2012 and raised awareness around the disease through campaigning and charity work. He died on 18 September 2021, aged 48.

== Honours ==
St Paul's

- Antrim Senior Football Championship: 1994, 1996, 1997

Antrim

- All-Ireland Senior B Football Championship: 1999 (c)

Sporting positions
Preceded by	Antrim Senior Football Team Captain; 1999-2000	Succeeded by
