= Mary Frances McDonald =

Irish feminist (1929–2021)

- Born: Mary Frances Bowen; 1929; Tuam, County Galway, Ireland
- Died: June 2021 (aged 91–92)
- Other names: Mamo McDonald
- Occupations: Feminist, President of the Irish Countrywomen's Association
- Spouse: Eugene McDonald (m. 1950; died 1979)
- Children: 11
- Awards: People of the Year (1999)

Mary Frances McDonald (aka Mamo McDonald, 1929 – 17 June 2021) was an Irish feminist.

Born Mary Frances Bowen in Tuam, County Galway, she joined the Irish Countrywomen's Association while living in Croom, County Limerick c.1947. She married Eugene McDonald in 1950, and was therefore required by law to leave her job at a bank. He died in 1979.

For over sixty-four years McDonald was a member of the ICA Clones Guild, which she helped to found. She became ICA National President in 1982 and played a major role in its acceptance as part of the women's movement in late-20th century Ireland. In 1999 she received a People of the Year award in recognition of her services for Irish women and older people. She was an Honorary President of the Association.

McDonald had eleven children. She described in an interview that "I didn’t start out as a feminist. It was life that made a feminist of me." In 2012, she stated her belief that the most life-changing invention for women is the washing machine.
