= Seán Corcoran =

Irish singer, musician, and collector (1946–2021)

- Born: 1946
- Died: 3 May 2021 (aged 74) Buxton, Derbyshire, England
- Occupation: Singer

Seán Corcoran (1946 – 3 May 2021) was an Irish singer, musician and collector of Irish traditional music.

== Biography ==
Born in 1946, Corcoran grew up in Clogherhead and Drogheda in County Louth. He began singing at Irish-language Feis Ceoil competitions and while still at school started to seek out local traditional singers. In the 1960s, he was also a member of the Rakish Paddies with Mick Moloney and Paul Brady. From the early 1970s, Corcoran worked as a collector for Breandán Breathnach and also assisted with the music journal Ceol. With Niall Fennell, Dave Smith and Tom Crean he was a member of the vocal group The Press Gang who released an album of the same name in 1976. In 1977, with Eddie Clarke, Maeve Donnelly and Maighread Ní Dhomhnaill, he released the album Sailing into Walpole's Marsh on the Green Linnet label. In the late 1970s he was also the director of Féile na Bóinne, the Drogheda folk music festival. Corcoran went on to study ethnomusicology at Queen's University Belfast and from 1979 worked as a collector of songs and music in West Fermanagh for the Arts Council of Northern Ireland. He also collected for the Irish Traditional Music Archive from 1994 until 2001.

Corcoran had lived in England for a number of years with his wife Vera, and died in Buxton in Derbyshire on 3 May 2021 at the age of 74.
