= Johnny Everard =

Irish hurler and Gaelic footballer (1924–2021)

Personal information
- Native name: Seán Eibhearard (Irish)
- Born: 16 April 1924 Templetuohy, County Tipperary, Ireland
- Died: 25 May 2021 (aged 97) Nenagh, County Tipperary, Ireland
- Occupation: Publican

Sport
- Sport: Hurling
- Position: Corner-forward
Clubs
- Years: Club
- Moyne-Templetuohy; Johnstown
Club titles
- Tipperary titles: 0
Inter-county
- Years: County
- 1949–1950: Tipperary
Inter-county titles
- Munster titles: 1
- All-Irelands: 1
- NHL: 1

Johnny Everard (16 April 1924 – 25 May 2021) was an Irish hurler and Gaelic footballer who played for Tipperary Championship club Moyne-Templetuohy. He was a member of the Tipperary senior teams in both codes for the 1949-50 league-championship season.

Following the death of John Coffey in August 2019, Everard became the oldest living All-Ireland medal winner and the oldest All-Ireland winner in Tipperary.

Everard died on 25 May 2021, aged 97.

== Honours ==
=== Player ===
Johnstown

- Kilkenny Minor Hurling Championship: 1942

Tipperary

- All-Ireland Senior Hurling Championship: 1950
- Munster Senior Hurling Championship: 1950
- National Hurling League: 1949–50
- Munster Junior Football Championship: 1952

=== Manager ===
Moyne-Templetuohy

- Tipperary Senior Hurling Championship: 1971

Sporting positions
| Preceded by | Tipperary Senior Football Captain; 1950 | Succeeded by |
Achievements
| Preceded by John Coffey | Oldest living All-Ireland medal winner 2019-2021 | Succeeded by Jimmy Lynam |
