= Vincent Daly =

Irish Gaelic footballer (1948–2021)

Personal information
- Native name: Uinseann Ó Dálaigh (Irish)
- Born: 1948 Granard, County Longford, Ireland
- Died: 26 May 2021 (aged 72) Tullamore, County Offaly, Ireland
- Occupation: Defence Forces member
- Height: 5 ft 11 in (180 cm)

Sport
- Sport: Gaelic football
- Position: Right corner-forward
Club
- Years: Club
- St. Mary's, Granard
Club titles
- Longford titles: 2
Inter-county
- Years: County
- Longford
Inter-county titles
- Leinster titles: 1
- All-Irelands: 0
- NFL: 0
- All Stars: 0

Vincent Daly (1948 – 26 May 2021) was an Irish Gaelic football player who played for club side St. Mary's, Granard and at inter-county level with the Longford senior football team.

== Career ==
Daly was a member of a footballing family associated with St. Mary's Granard club, stretching back to the 1930's and beyond. Daly's own career started with a win in the schools' championship in 1960. Further championship medals followed at juvenile and underage levels before he was selected to play on the Longford minor team in 1966. Daly won a County Championship title before he reached the highlight of his career when he captained the Longford senior team to their only Leinster Championship title in 1968.

== Honours ==
St Mary's, Granard

- Longford Senior Football Championship: 1967, 1970
- Longford Under-21 Football Championship: 1966, 1967, 1968

Longford

- Leinster Senior Football Championship: 1968 (c)
