= Paddy Cahill =

Irish filmmaker and cycling advocate (1977–2021)

- Born: 21 April 1977; Ireland
- Died: 9 April 2021 (aged 43)
- Occupation: Filmmaker
- Website: paddycahill.com

Paddy Cahill (21 April 1977 – 9 April 2021) was an Irish filmmaker and cycling advocate. Most of his films are about Irish art and architecture.

In accordance with his wishes, after his death his coffin was mounted on a trailer and drawn through the streets of Dublin to Glasnevin Cemetery by a bicycle cycled by his brother, Conor.

== Filmography ==
- Seán Hillen, Merging Views 2016. Director.
- Amanda Coogan: Long Now 2017. Director.

== Awards ==
- Best Short Documentary, 2016 Galway Film Fleadh, for Seán Hillen, Merging Views
