= Tommy Kenny =

Irish sports administrator (1933–2021)

President of the Ladies' Gaelic Football Association
- In office 1977–1979
- Preceded by: Jim Kennedy
- Succeeded by: Tom Dowd

Personal details
- Born: 1933 Belmont, County Offaly, Ireland
- Died: 7 February 2021 (aged 87) Clara, County Offaly, Ireland
- Occupation: ESB employee

Thomas Kenny (1933 – 7 February 2021) was an Irish sports administrator who was the second president of the Ladies' Gaelic Football Association, a position he held from 1977 until 1979.

== Biography ==
A County Offaly native, Tommy Kenny spent his entire working life with the ESB in Ferbane Power Station. His administrative career began in earnest when he served as secretary with local clubs St Saran's and Belmont, and he was an Offaly County Board delegate for many years. Regarded as one of the founding fathers of the Ladies' Gaelic Football Association, Kenny served as LGFA President for two years. He was also a selector on Offaly minor and under-21 teams during the 1970s and 1980s, with two Leinster under-21 titles achieved.

Kenny died on 7 February 2021.
