= Jim Sherwin =

Irish sports broadcaster & journalist (1940–2021)

- Born: James A. Sherwin; 28 February 1940; Phibsboro, Dublin, Ireland
- Died: 27 December 2021 (aged 81); Delgany, County Wicklow, Ireland
- Occupations: Newsreader, broadcaster, sports commentator
- Years active: 1961–2005
- Employer: RTÉ Sport
- Spouse: Anne Roche
- Children: 4

James A. Sherwin (28 February 1940 – 27 December 2021) was an Irish rugby union commentator and broadcaster. Known as 'the voice of rugby', his career with RTÉ spanned five decades.

== Career ==
Sherwin's broadcasting career began with Radio Éireann in 1961. He quickly moved to television, where he worked as a continuity announcer and newsreader. Sherwin joined RTÉ Sport where his rugby commentary on radio and television spanned four decades from 1970 to 2004. He commentated for more than 20 years on tennis and was RTÉ's main commentator at eight Olympic Games from Munich 1972 to Athens 2004. Sherwin proved himself to be a versatile broadcaster and was also RTÉ's lead commentator on many non-sporting outside broadcasts, including the inauguration of Presidents, and produced documentaries and films on a wide range of subjects, including health, social issues and sport.

== Personal life and death ==
Sherwin married Mary Roche from Raheny in June 1966.

He died after a brief illness at his home in Delgany, County Wicklow on 27 December 2021, aged 81. He is survived by his wife and four children.
