= Mick Kerr =

Gaelic footballer from Ireland (1934–2021)

Personal information
- Native name: Mcheál Mac Giolla Cheara (Irish)
- Born: April 1934 Beragh, County Tyrone, Northern Ireland
- Died: 30 January 2021 (aged 86) Beragh, County Tyrone, Northern Ireland

Sport
- Sport: Gaelic football
- Position: Right corner-forward
Club
- Years: Club
- Beragh Red Knights
Club titles
- Tyrone titles: 0
Inter-county
- Years: County
- Tyrone
Inter-county titles
- Ulster titles: 1
- All-Irelands: 0
- NFL: 0

Michael Kerr (April 1934 – 30 January 2021) was an Irish Gaelic football player, manager and administrator.

== Career ==
Kerr began his club career at underage level with Beragh Red Knights. After lining out in two minor finals he began a 17-year senior career in 1952, winning a St Enda's Cup title in 1958. Kerr made his breakthrough with the Tyrone senior football team as a 19-year-old. He played at right corner-forward when Tyrone won their maiden Ulster Championship title in 1956. Following his playing career, Kerr continued his involvement in Gaelic football as manager of the Beragh Red Knights senior team on a number of occasions, however, it was at juvenile level that he enjoyed coaching success.

== Honours ==
Beragh Red Knights

- St Enda's Cup: 1958

Tyrone

- Ulster Senior Football Championship: 1956
