= World Report (RTÉ) =

- Genre: News and Current Affairs
- Country of origin: Ireland
- Language(s): English
- Home station: RTÉ Radio 1
- Recording studio: Donnybrook, Dublin
- Original release: Present
- Audio format: FM and Digital radio
- Website: Official Site

World Report is an Irish radio programme broadcast on RTÉ Radio 1. The programme includes a series of radio-essay reports from journalists and correspondents based around the globe. It often examines some of the less well-covered, but no less critical, developments and conflicts in international news and current affairs. The programme is one of the longest-running weekly broadcasts from RTÉ News. It was launched in 1969 by Sean Duignan and Mike Burns. Presenters over the decades have also included Sean O'Rourke, David McCullagh, Colm Ó Mongáin, John Burke and Diarmaid Fleming. After the retirement of Ciarán MacMáthuna and the ending of his long-running programme Mo Cheoil Thú in November 2005, World Report moved into the slot vacated in the Sunday morning schedule and now airs at 08:10 for twenty minutes.

The latest episode of the show can be listened to online where there is also a number of previous editions available to download.
