= COVID-19 lockdowns by country =

Countries and territories around the world enforced lockdowns of varying stringency in response to the COVID-19 pandemic.

This included total movement control while others enforced restrictions based on time. In many cases, only essential businesses were allowed to remain open. Schools, universities and colleges closed either on a nationwide or local basis in 63 countries, affecting approximately 47 percent of the world's student population.

Beginning with the first lockdown in China's Hubei province and nationwide in Italy in March 2020, lockdowns continued to be implemented in many countries throughout 2020 and 2021. On 24 March 2020, the entire 1.3 billion population of India was ordered to stay at home during its lockdown, making it the largest of the pandemic. The world's longest continuous lockdown lasting 234 days took place in Buenos Aires, Argentina, in 2020. As of October 2021, the city of Melbourne, Australia, and certain cities in Peru and Chile spent the most cumulative days in lockdown over separate periods, although measures varied between these countries.

A few countries and territories did not use the strategy, including Japan, Belarus, Nicaragua, Sweden, South Korea, Hong Kong, Taiwan, Tanzania, Uruguay, two states in Brazil (Roraima and Rondônia) and certain United States states.

== Countries and territories with lockdowns ==
=== Argentina ===
ASPO and DISPO in Argentina: A successful example of a combination of non-pharmacological and pharmacological measures for the care of the pandemic population:

Mandatory Preventive Social Isolation (ASPO) decreed by the national executive branch:

On March 12, 2020, one day after the WHO declared the outbreak of the new coronavirus as a pandemic, the national State issued the Decree of Necessity and Urgency (DNU) No. 260/2020 by which the public health emergency established by Law No. 27,541 on December 21, 2019, was extended for a period of one year. The recitals of this decree express: “That in the last few days, the spread of cases of the new coronavirus Covid-19 has been noted in numerous countries of different continents, reaching our region and our country. That, in the current situation, it is necessary to adopt new timely, transparent, consensual and evidence-based measures, in addition to those already adopted since the beginning of this epidemiological situation, in order to mitigate its spread and its health impact”.

On March 19, 2020, the National Executive Power issued DNU No. 297/2020, which provided for the mandatory preventive social isolation (ASPO) for all persons living in the country or temporarily in the country at the time of its issuance, in order to protect public health, an inalienable obligation of the national State. This provision provided that while the ASPO was in force, people should remain in their usual residences, refrain from going to their workplaces and could not travel on roads, highways and public spaces, in order to prevent the circulation and spread of the COVID-19 virus and the consequent impact on public health and other derived subjective rights, such as the life and physical integrity of people. Permanent controls were also established on routes, roads and public spaces, accesses and other strategic places, in order to guarantee compliance with the regulations established within the framework of the sanitary emergency. On the other hand, as the mandatory isolation was extended, it was assumed that the epidemiological situation was not homogeneous within the national territory and different quarantine modalities began to be adopted according to the reality of the different jurisdictions of the country, in accordance with a joint work between national and local authorities. Therefore, DNU No. 355/2020, dated April 11, already established that the Governors or the Head of the City Government could submit to the national Government, for its authorization, proposals to free some activities with the due adoption of operating protocols for each case. Exceptions to the ASPO and to the prohibition to circulate were also progressively incorporated, in order not to interrupt the supply of essential products and services and, also, to incorporate the performance of different economic activities in those places where the evolution of the epidemiological situation would allow it. On the other hand, DNU No. 459/2020, dated May 11, specified a geographical segmentation to provide for exceptions to the ASPO, distinguishing three segments: departments or districts with up to 500,000 inhabitants, departments or districts with more than 500,000 inhabitants, and the Metropolitan Area of Buenos Aires (AMBA). This Decree defined exceptions for the first two segments and made a difference with the AMBA, as the most complicated area of contagion5 . DNU No. 520/20, at the end of June, established as a parameter to differentiate the geographical realities the doubling time of cases confirmed by COVID-19: restrictions could be released if this period was not less than 15 days and if the health system had sufficient capacity to respond to the health demand. For urban agglomerates, departments or districts that did not meet these requirements, the ASPO was extended. These differentiated modalities of quarantine according to the epidemiological realities of the country showed interesting results. Thus, in the recitals of DNU N° 520/2020 of June 7, the recovery of the economic activity in most of the country was highlighted: “According to data provided by the Ministry of Productive Development of the Nation, more than SIXTY-FIVE PERCENT (65%) of the registered workers of the whole country are already part of activities authorized to produce; in some provinces, this number climbs up to EIGHTY PERCENT (80%)”. It is important to add that on May 13, 2020, the Senate of the Nation approved a set of Decrees of Necessity and Urgency issued by the Executive Branch, among which Decrees No. 297/2020, No. 325/2020 and No. 355/20206 were included.

https://www.ohchr.org/sites/default/files/Documents/HRBodies/SP/COVID/States/Argentina1.pdf

Three months after the declaration of the sanitary emergency, on June 7, 2020, at the national level, the restriction measures began to be relaxed in order to achieve the recovery of the highest possible degree of normality in terms of economic and social functioning, establishing geographical zones that would go from social, preventive and mandatory isolation to social, preventive and mandatory distancing (hereinafter, DISPO) due to the decrease in the levels of virus circulation and number of contagions2. In this sense, almost all the provinces of the country were enabled to move to the new stage of social, preventive and obligatory distancing3, allowing new activities and reducing both internal and entry controls to their territories. https://amnistia.org.ar/wp-content/uploads/delightful-downloads/2021/04/0504_Amnist%C3%ADa-informe-anual-pandemia-2.pdf

=== Australia ===
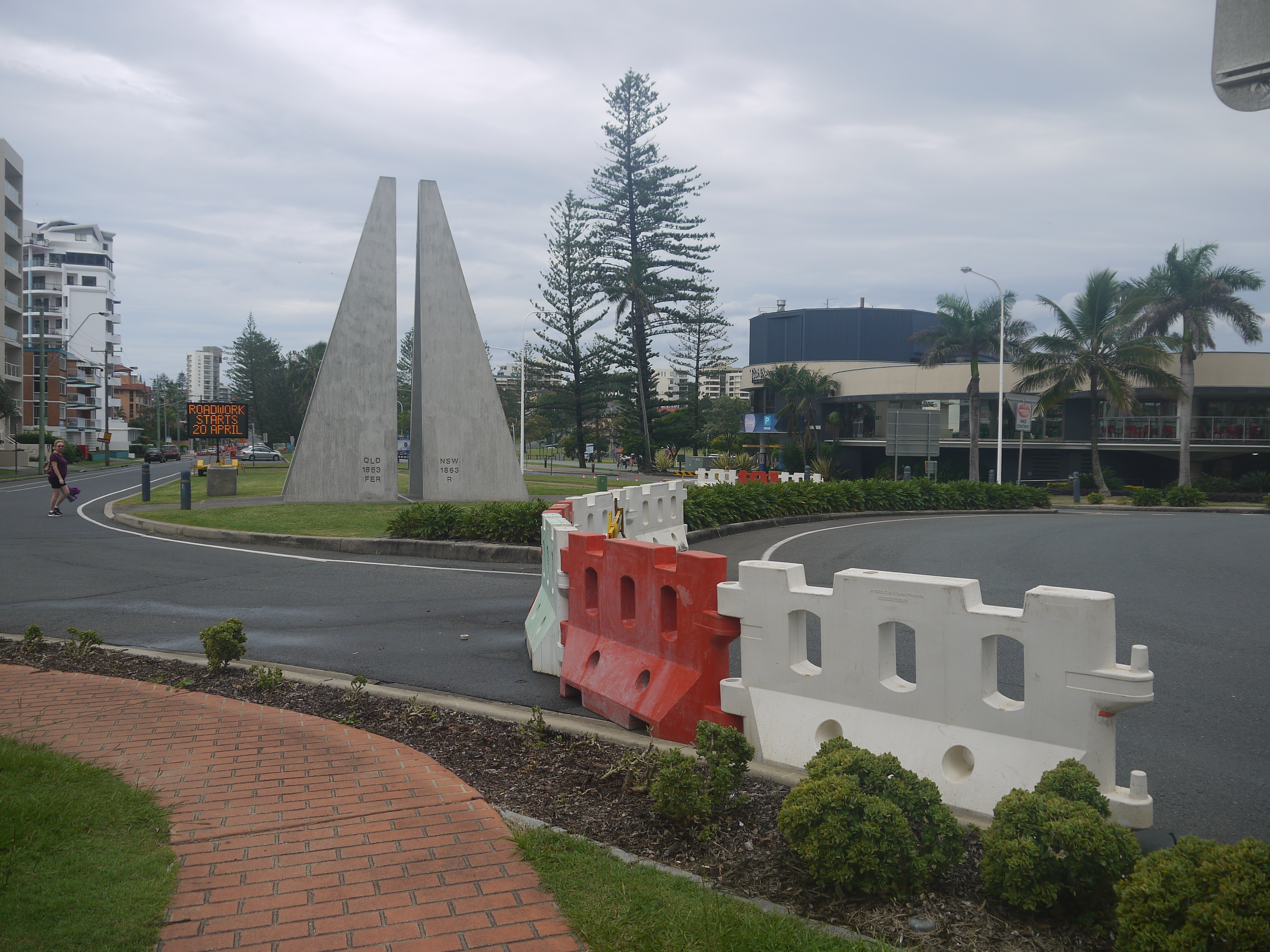
A barrier on the state border of Queensland and New South Wales preventing interstate travel in April 2020 during the COVID-19 pandemic in Australia.

A number of Australian states, territories, and cities have implemented lockdowns in response to the pandemic. The country entered a general nationwide lockdown on 23 March 2020 during the first wave of the pandemic, which was lifted on 15 May 2020.

The state of Victoria, particularly its capital city of Melbourne, the country's second most populous city with five million residents, entered an extended lockdown on 7 July 2020 in response to a rapidly growing community outbreak. Initial measures included the closure of all non-essential services, including retail entertainment venues and gyms. Restaurant and bar establishments were permitted to open in take-away and delivery capacities only. Schools and childcare facilities were also ordered to close. Face coverings were made mandatory as of 23 July 2020, with a fine of $200 AUD for non-compliance to those above 12 years of age, although formal exemptions could be acquired. Initially scheduled to last six weeks, restrictions were tightened further on 2 August after cases continued to grow, including a ban on travel further than a five kilometre (3 mile) radius from place of residence, a nighttime curfew of 8pm to 5am, a one-hour limit on outdoor exercise, a one-person per day limit on shopping for essentials, and public gatherings limited to a maximum of two people. Restrictions were progressively eased as the case rate declined, and were completely lifted on 28 October. With a total duration of 112 days, the Victorian lockdown was at the time the longest continuous period of COVID-19 lockdown globally as of October 2020. The lockdown resulted in the state recording zero active cases of COVID-19 in November 2020.

Victoria entered its fourth lockdown on 28 May 2021 in response to an outbreak of the Delta variant. Originally scheduled for seven days, the lockdown was extended to two weeks and lifted on 10 June. Another outbreak of the Delta variant saw Greater Sydney enter lockdown on 26 June 2021, scheduled to last until 16 July, but extended by two weeks on 14 July then until 28 August and the end of September 2021. Combined with snap lockdowns declared in Brisbane, Perth, and Darwin, more than 12 million people were in lockdown across Australia on 29 June 2021.

Brief "snap lockdowns" in response to new clusters, particularly of the Alpha, Beta, and Delta variants, have been implemented at various times across the country.

Metropolitan Melbourne's 6th lockdown ended in October 2021, with the city spending among the longest amounts of time spent in lockdown in the world.

Snap lockdowns over time
| Area | Date | Duration (days) | Ref |
|---|---|---|---|
| South Australia | 19–22 November 2020 | 3 | |
| Greater Brisbane (Qld) | 8–11 January 2021 | 3 | |
| Perth, Peel, and the South West (WA) | 31 January–5 February 2021 | 6 | |
| Victoria | 13–17 February 2021 | 4 | |
| Greater Brisbane (Qld) | 29 March–1 April 2021 | 3 | |
| Perth and Peel (WA) | 23–26 April 2021 | 3 | |
| Regional Victoria | 28 May–3 June 2021 | 7 | |
| Metropolitan Melbourne (Vic) | 28 May–10 June 2021 | 14 (originally 7) | |
| Darwin (NT) | 27 June–2 July 2021 | 5 (originally 2) | |
| Perth and Peel (WA) | 28 June–2 July 2021 | 4 | |
| Greater Brisbane (Qld) | 29 June–3 July 2021 | 4 | |
| Alice Springs (NT) | 30 June–3 July 2021 | 3 | |
| Victoria | 16–27 July 2021 | 11 (originally 5) | |
| Central West (NSW) | 20–27 July 2021 | 7 | |
| South Australia | 20–27 July 2021 | 7 | |
| South East Queensland (Qld) | 31 July–8 August 2021 | 8 (originally 3) | |
| Hunter (NSW) | 5 August-11 October 2021 (Note: Lockdown continues until 15 December 2021 for non vaccinated adults.) | 67 (originally 7) | |
| Upper Hunter (NSW) | 5 August 2021 – 16 September 2021 (Note: Lockdown continues until 15 December 2021 for non vaccinated adults.) | 42 (originally 7) | |
| Regional Victoria | 5–10 August 2021 | 5 (originally 7) | |
| Metropolitan Melbourne (Vic) | 5 August 2021 – 21 October 2021 | 78 (Note: End-date of lockdown was subject to the vaccine rollout. Restrictions were eased, when 70% of the 16yo+ population had been vaccinated)(originally 7) | |
| Armidale (NSW) | 7 August–10 September 2021 (Note: Lockdown continues until 15 December 2021 for non vaccinated adults.) | 34 (originally 7) | |
| Cairns and Yarrabah (Qld) | 8–11 August 2021 | 3 | |
| Tamworth (NSW) | 9 August–10 September 2021 | 32 (originally 7) | |
| Byron Bay, Richmond Valley, Ballina, and Lismore (NSW) | 9 August–10 September 2021 | 32 (originally 7) | |
| Dubbo (NSW) | 11 August-11 October 2021 (Note: Lockdown continues until 15 December 2021 for non vaccinated adults.) | 61 (originally 7) | |
| Western New South Wales (Note: Includes shires of Walgett and Bourke. Included Coonamble & Warren Shires until 11 September, Bogan Shire until 16 September, Gilgandra & Brewarrina Shires until 22 September, and Narromine Shire until 25 September.) | 11 August-11 October 2021 (Note: Lockdown continues until 15 December 2021 for non vaccinated adults.) | 61 (originally 7) | |
| Australian Capital Territory | 12 August–15 October 2021 | 63 (originally 7) | |
| Regional New South Wales (Note: Applies for all others Regional NSW outside Hunter Region, Dubbo, Central West, South Coast, Goulburn, Queanbeyan-Palerang, Snowy Monaro and Western New South Wales) | 14 August–10 September 2021 (Note: Lockdown continues until 15 December 2021 for non vaccinated adults.) | 28 (originally 7) | |
| Orange (NSW) | 14 August–24 September 2021 (Note: Lockdown continues until 15 December 2021 for non vaccinated adults.) | 41 (originally 7) | |
| Darwin (NT) | 16–19 August 2021 | 3 | |
| Katherine (NT) | 16–20 August 2021 | 4 (originally 3) | |
| Regional Victoria | 21 August–9 September 2021 | 19 | |
| Yass Valley (NSW) | 14–27 September 2021 (Note: Lockdown continues until 15 December 2021 for non vaccinated adults.) | 14 | |
| Ballarat (VIC) | 15–22 September 2021 | 7 | |
| Albury and Lismore (NSW) | 16–23 September 2021 | 7 | |
| Glen Innes (NSW) | 17–24 September 2021 | 7 | |
| Hilltops (NSW) | 17 September–1 October 2021 (Note: Lockdown continues until 15 December 2021 for non vaccinated adults.) | 14 (originally 7) | |
| Greater Geelong and Surf Coast (Vic) | 20–26 September 2021 | 7 | |
| Mitchell Shire (Vic) | 20 September 2021 – 13 October 2021 | 23 (Note: End-date of lockdown is subject to the vaccine rollout. Restrictions are set to be eased when 70% of the eligible population has been vaccinated) (originally 7) | |
| Cowra (NSW) | 20 September-5 October 2021 (Note: Lockdown continues until 15 December 2021 for non vaccinated adults.) | 14 (originally 7) | |
| Byron Bay, Kempsey and Tweed Heads (NSW) | 21–28 September 2021 (Note: Lockdown continues until 15 December 2021 for non vaccinated adults.) | 7 | |
| Muswellbrook (NSW) | 28 September–11 October 2021 (Note: Lockdown continues until 15 December 2021 for non vaccinated adults.) | 13 (originally 7) | |
| Port Macquarie (NSW) | 28 September–5 October 2021 (Note: Lockdown continues until 15 December 2021 for non vaccinated adults.) | 7 | |
| Latrobe Valley (Vic) | 29 September–6 October 2021 | 7 | |
| Oberon (NSW) | 29 September–11 October 2021 (Note: Lockdown continues until 15 December 2021 for non vaccinated adults.) | 12 (originally 7) | |
| Snowy Monaro (NSW) | 30 September–11 October 2021 (Note: Lockdown continues until 15 December 2021 for non vaccinated adults.) | 11 (originally 7) | |
| Shepparton (Vic) | 1–8 October 2021 | 7 | |
| Moorabool (Vic) | 2–9 October 2021 | 7 | |
| Casino (NSW) | 2-11 October 2021 (Note: Lockdown continues until 15 December 2021 for non vaccinated adults.) | 9 | |
| Lismore (NSW) | 3–11 October 2021 (Note: Lockdown continues until 15 December 2021 for non vaccinated adults.) | 8 | |
| Gunnedah (NSW) | 5–11 October 2021 (Note: Lockdown continues until 15 December 2021 for non vaccinated adults.) | 6 | |
| Taree, Forster & Tuncurry (NSW) | 5–11 October 2021 (Note: Lockdown continues until 15 December 2021 for non vaccinated adults.) | 6 | |
| Mildura (Vic) | 9–21 October 2021 | 12 (originally 7) | |
| Southern Tasmania (Note: Includes LGAs of Brighton, Central Highlands, Clarence, Derwent Valley, Glamorgan–Spring Bay, Glenorchy, Hobart, Huon Valley, Sorell, Southern Midlands, Tasman & Kingborough.) | 15–18 October 2021 | 3 | |
| Katherine (NT) | 5–8 November 2021 | 3 | |
| Katherine (NT) | 15–22 November 2021 | 7 (originally 3) | |
| Tennant Creek (NT) | 17–22 December 2021 | 3 | |

=== Austria ===
In November 2021, Austria introduced lockdown measures, but only for unvaccinated people, in response to an increase in cases and low vaccination rate. The country introduced a lockdown for all citizens a few days later, making it the first European country to reintroduce such measures in the winter of 2021.

=== Bangladesh ===
On 22 March 2020, Bangladesh announced a ten-day lockdown, starting from 26 March. The lockdown in the country was extended several times to 30 May.

=== Cambodia ===
On 15 April 2021, Cambodia's government enacted a strict stay-at-home order across the entirety of Phnom Penh and Ta Khmau in response to the country's largest COVID-19 outbreak of the pandemic. Certain districts were declared as "red zones", banning people from leaving their homes except for medical emergencies. Sihanoukville also entered a lockdown on 24 April.

=== Canada ===
On 25 January 2020, the first identified presumptive case in Canada was a 56-year-old male who had travelled to Wuhan, China, before returning to Toronto on 22 January. Canada issued a travel advisory against non-essential travel to China due to the outbreak, including a regional travel advisory to avoid all travel to the province of Hubei.

Federal health officials stated that the risk in Canada was low.

On 26 January 2020, Chief Public Health Officer Dr. Theresa Tam tweeted, "There is no clear evidence that this virus is spread easily from person to person. The risk to Canadians remains low."

Three days later, on 29 January, Dr. Tam told Canadians that "It's going to be rare, but we are expecting cases."

On 1 February, the position of the prime minister and the administration remained that it would be discriminatory to exclude travellers from China, the source (and, at the time, still the epicentre) of the disease.

During March, Canadian provinces implemented lockdowns in response to COVID-19.

Ontario, the country's most populous province, had its first provincewide lockdown starting on 26 December 2020. The lockdown was strengthened with a stay-at-home order effective 14 January 2021, and reopened on a regional basis starting 10 February. As a result of the third wave of the COVID-19 pandemic in the province caused by SARS-CoV-2 variants, the government of Ontario once again announced a four-week provincewide shutdown effective 3 April. This shutdown was once again strengthened with another 28-day stay-at-home order starting 8 April, in order to quickly combat the urgent crisis in the province's hospital capacity being caused by the variants.

The city of Toronto, Ontario is considered to have the longest continuous COVID-19 lockdown of any major city in the world.

=== China ===
China was the first country to enforce the quarantine and lockdown of cities and later whole provinces in late January 2020. Chinese Communist Party general secretary Xi Jinping said he personally authorized the unprecedented lockdown of Wuhan and other cities beginning on 23 January. Although such measures are a very old tool of epidemic control, their use at the scale of a large city such as Wuhan or the even larger scale of provinces was controversial among experts at the time, with questions about their effectiveness and their ethics. Some public health experts, while not always condemning the measure, raised the issue of the inevitable psychological toll such measures would have. An ex-World Health Organization (WHO) official who headed the organization's Western Pacific Region during the SARS outbreak said that "the containment of a city [hadn't] been done in the history of international public health policy". The WHO called the decision to quarantine Wuhan "new to science". By early April, all lockdowns had ended or relaxed to a certain degree as the cases started to dwindle and the outbreak had come under control.

On March 27, 2022, Shanghai experienced an extended lockdown. Many residents lacked food. On June 1, 2022, Shanghai was returning to normal. A series of protests in mainland China against COVID-19 lockdowns began in November 2022.

=== Denmark ===
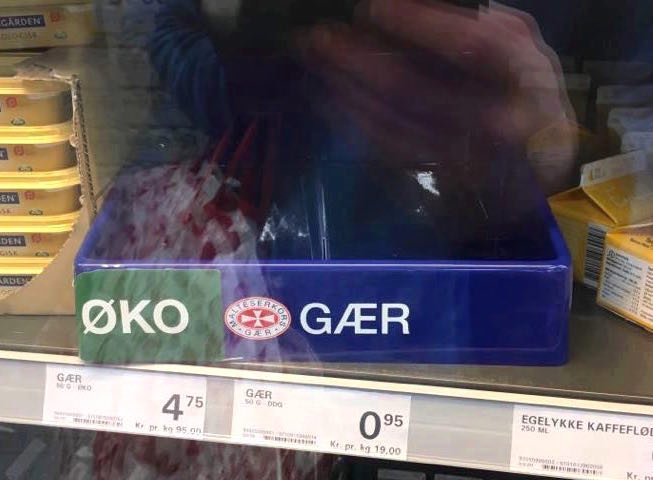
An empty yeast tray at a supermarket in Odense on 17 March 2020. Following the announcement of a general lockdown, large-scale panic buying of several everyday products occurred.

Starting on 13 March 2020, all people working in non-essential functions in the public sector were ordered to stay home for two weeks. These restrictions were announced with an acknowledgement that the circumstances would be difficult, and Prime Minister Mette Frederiksen urged Danes to practice samfundssind (roughly, community-mindedness). The first documented use of this Danish word was in the 1936, and the then-Prime Minister Thorvald Stauning used the term to call for solidarity at the outbreak of World War II in Europe.

In the private sector, employers were urged by the authorities to allow their employees to stay home in the same period and work from there if possible, although this should not affect functions that are essential to the society (such as pharmacy workers and people working with sale of food and maintenance of critical infrastructure).

On that same date, all secondary education (like gymnasiums), universities, libraries, indoor cultural institutions and similar places were closed, initially for two weeks. Starting on 16 March, all primary schools, daycare and similar places were also closed for two weeks. Virtual (online) schooling was used to some degree. The municipalities are establishing limited daycare for children where the parents could not stay home and take care of them. Because of the vulnerability of elderly to COVID-19, it was strongly recommended that grandparents should not take care of their grandchildren.

=== Fiji ===
On 19 March 2020, Fiji confirmed its first case in Lautoka. In response, the Government of Fiji ordered the lockdown of the city on 20 March with closures of all schools and non-essential services all over the country. On 3 April 2020, Fiji's capital, Suva, went into lockdown after confirming two new cases. More than 300,000 residents were confined to their homes and all non-essential services in the city was closed for two weeks.

On 19 April 2021, Nadi and Lautoka went into lockdown after recording its first community transmission in one year. As cases continues to escalate in its second wave, the government has ruled out any possibility of a nationwide lockdown but would focus on targeted lockdowns of communities instead.

=== France ===
From 17 March 2020, all people in France were required to complete and carry an exemption form to leave their homes and can be fined for non-essential journeys. Essential journeys include shopping for food, travelling to and from work, accessing healthcare, and exercising within 1 km of the home for up to 1 hour. Police around the country had set up road blocks to check people who were out and about had good reason and that their exemption declarations were in order. These measures were lifted on 11 May 2020, with remaining restrictions on travel further than 100 km away from one's residence. The latter restrictions were lifted on 2 June 2020.

On October 28, president Emmanuel Macron announced a second lockdown to begin on October 30. During this second lockdown, schools remain open and more industries can keep operating (construction, public services...). Like the first lockdown, citizens need to sign their certificates to can go around within 1 km up to hour per day. Fines are 135 euros the 1st time, 200 euros for 2 times within 15 days and 3750 euros and 6 months jail sentence for 3 times within 30 days. This lockdown was replaced by a curfew on December 15, 2020 which was itself abolished on June 20, 2021.

=== Ghana ===
Empty streets of the Greater Accra Region following the lockdown

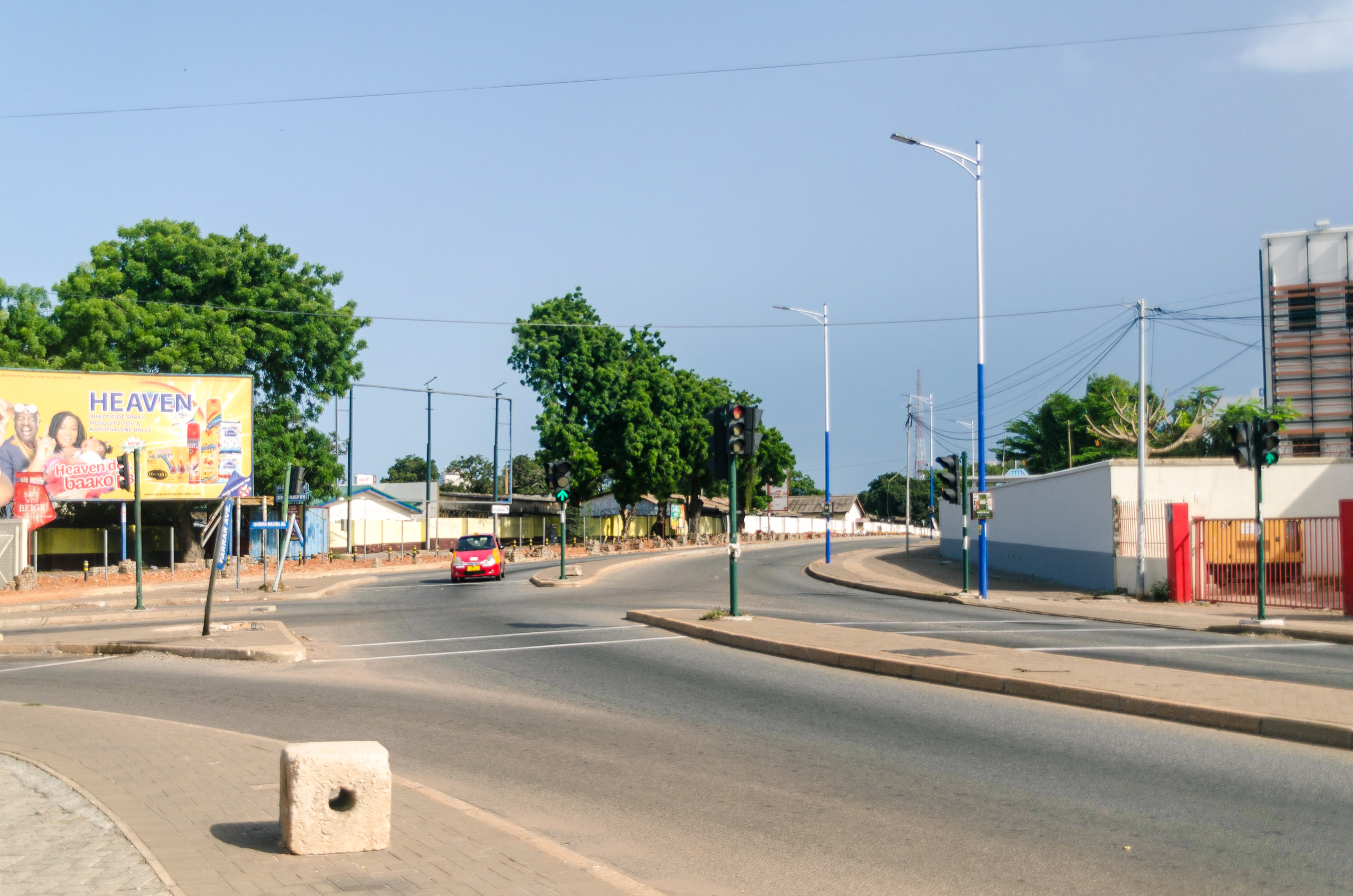

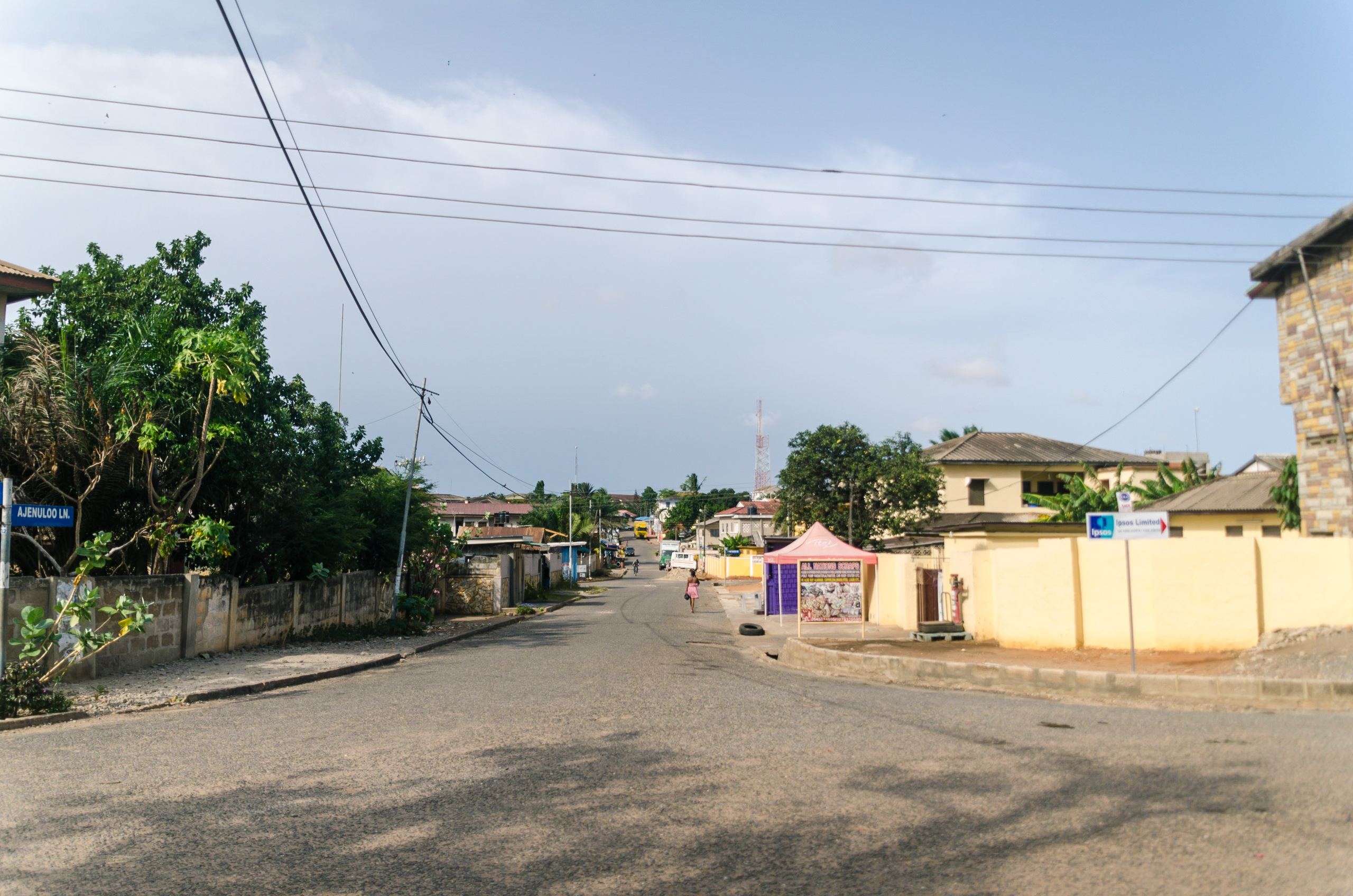

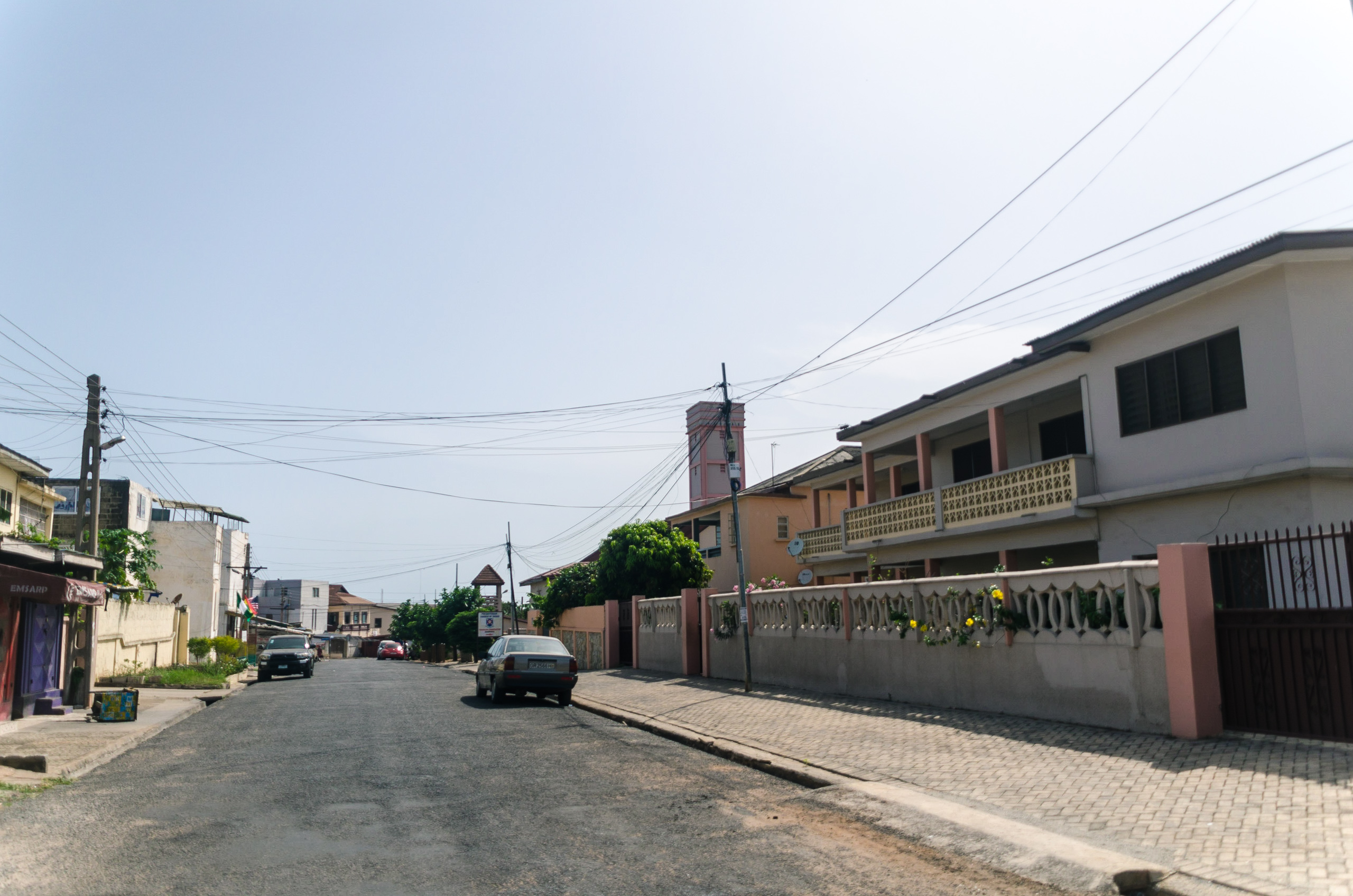

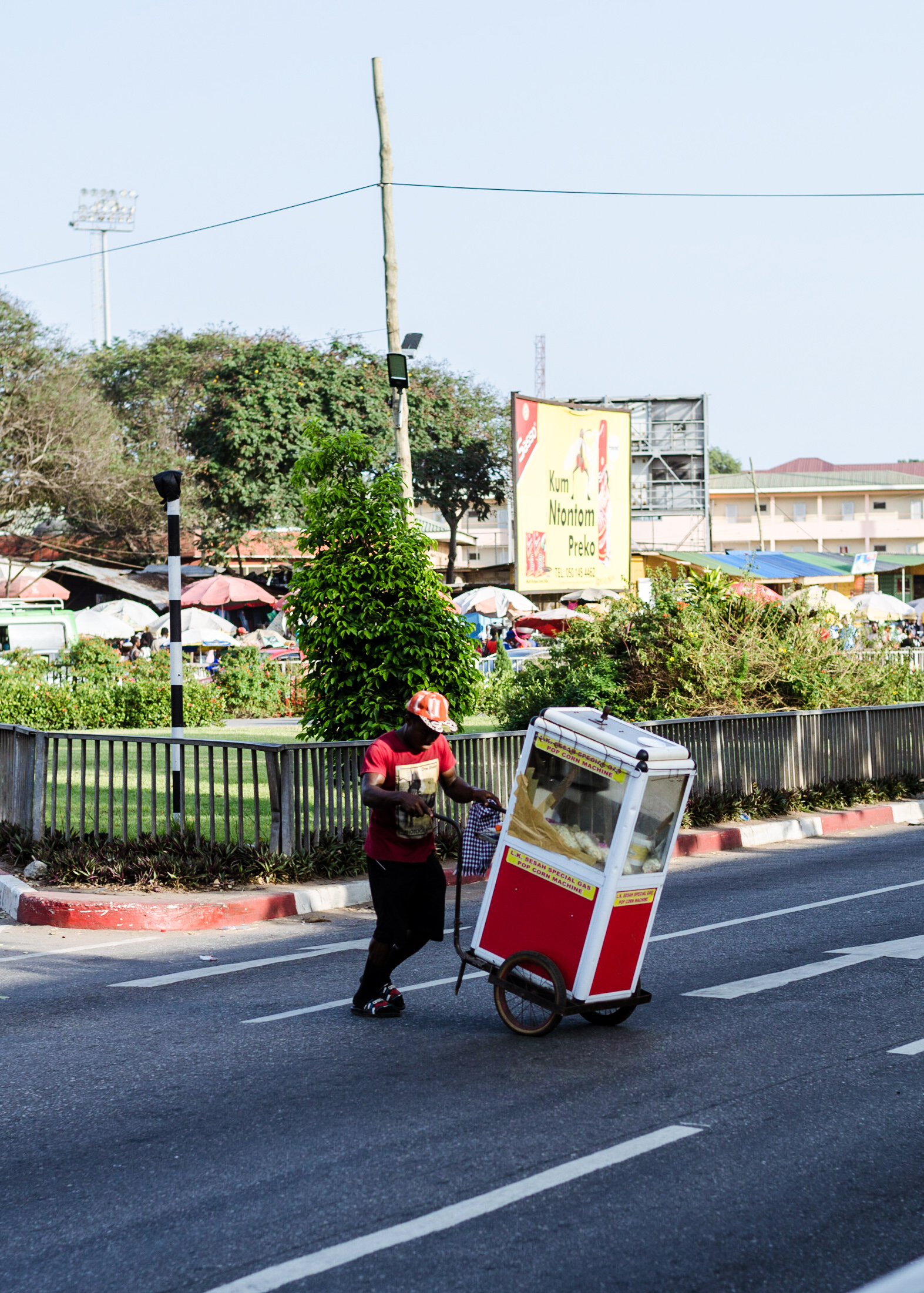

On 15 March 2020, at a press conference on the state of COVID-19, officials banned all public gatherings, including conferences, workshops, funerals, festivals, political rallies, and church activities in order to reduce the spread of COVID-19. Basic schools, senior high schools, and both public and private universities were also closed. BECE and WASSCE candidates were permitted to remain in school whiles adhering to social distancing protocols.

On 30 March 2020, the partial lock down of Accra and Kumasi took effect. Only Members of the Executive, Legislature and the Judiciary; and some services such as those that were involved in the production, distribution and marketing of food, beverages, pharmaceuticals, medicine, paper and plastic packages, media and telecommunications were exempted from the restrictions. In April 2020, At a press briefing, the Director General of the Ghana Health Service, announced the commencement of local production of nose masks as part of efforts to arrest the spread of the pandemic. People who refused to wear face masks in public could face jail terms of 4–10 years, a fine of GHS12,000 (about US$2,065) to GHS60,000 (roughly US$10,320), or both, according to the new Executive Instrument, E.I. 164, signed by the President on June 15, 2020. In accordance with Article 21 of the Ghanaian Constitution, President Akufo-Addo declared various limitations on movement under the recently adopted Imposition of Restrictions Act 1012 of 2020. This was announced on 21 March 2020.

Travel to Ghana from countries with over 200 positive COVID-19 cases was deterred by authorities, with such travelers being denied admission; however, this restriction did not apply to Ghanaian citizens or people with resident permits. All of the country's borders were later closed from midnight of Sunday 22 March 2020. Passport services were also suspended.

=== India ===
On the evening of 24 March 2020, the Government of India ordered a nationwide lockdown for 21 days, limiting the movement of the entire 1.38 billion (138 crore) population of India as a preventive measure against the COVID-19 pandemic in India. It was ordered after a 14-hour voluntary public curfew on 22 March, followed by enforcement of a series of regulations in COVID-19 affected countries. The lockdown was placed when the number of confirmed positive coronavirus cases in India was approximately 500. Upon its announcement, a mass movement of people across the country was described as the largest since the partition of India in 1947. Observers stated that the lockdown had slowed the growth rate of the pandemic by 6 April to a rate of doubling every six days, and by 18 April, to a rate of doubling every eight days. As the end of the first lockdown period approached, state governments and other advisory committees recommended extending the lockdown. The governments of Odisha and Punjab extended the state lockdowns to 1 May. Maharashtra, Karnataka, West Bengal, and Telangana followed suit. On 14 April, Prime Minister Narendra Modi extended the nationwide lockdown until 3 May, on the written recommendation of governors and lieutenant governors of all the states, with conditional relaxations after 20 April for the regions where the spread had been contained or was minimal.

On 1 May, the Government of India extended the nationwide lockdown further by two weeks until 17 May. The Government divided all the districts into three zones based on the spread of the virus—green, red, and orange—with relaxations applied accordingly. On 17 May, the lockdown was further extended until 31 May by the National Disaster Management Authority.

On 30 May, it was announced that lockdown restrictions were to be lifted from then onwards, while the lockdown would be further extended until 30 June for only the containment zones. Services would be resumed in a phased manner starting from 8 June. It was termed as "Unlock 1.0". Modi later clarified that the lockdown phase in the country was over and that 'unlock' had already begun.

The second phase of unlock, Unlock 2.0, was announced for the period of 1 to 31 July, with more ease in restrictions. Unlock 3.0 was announced for August. Similarly, Unlock 4.0 was announced for September and Unlock 5.0 for the month of October. In the same way, Unlock 6.0 was announced for the month of November, Unlock 7.0 was announced for the month of December.

In 2021, due to the largest wave of infection in the country, several state governments, including Uttar Pradesh, and Delhi, announced complete lockdowns in April 2021.

=== Indonesia ===
==== Large-scale social restrictions ====
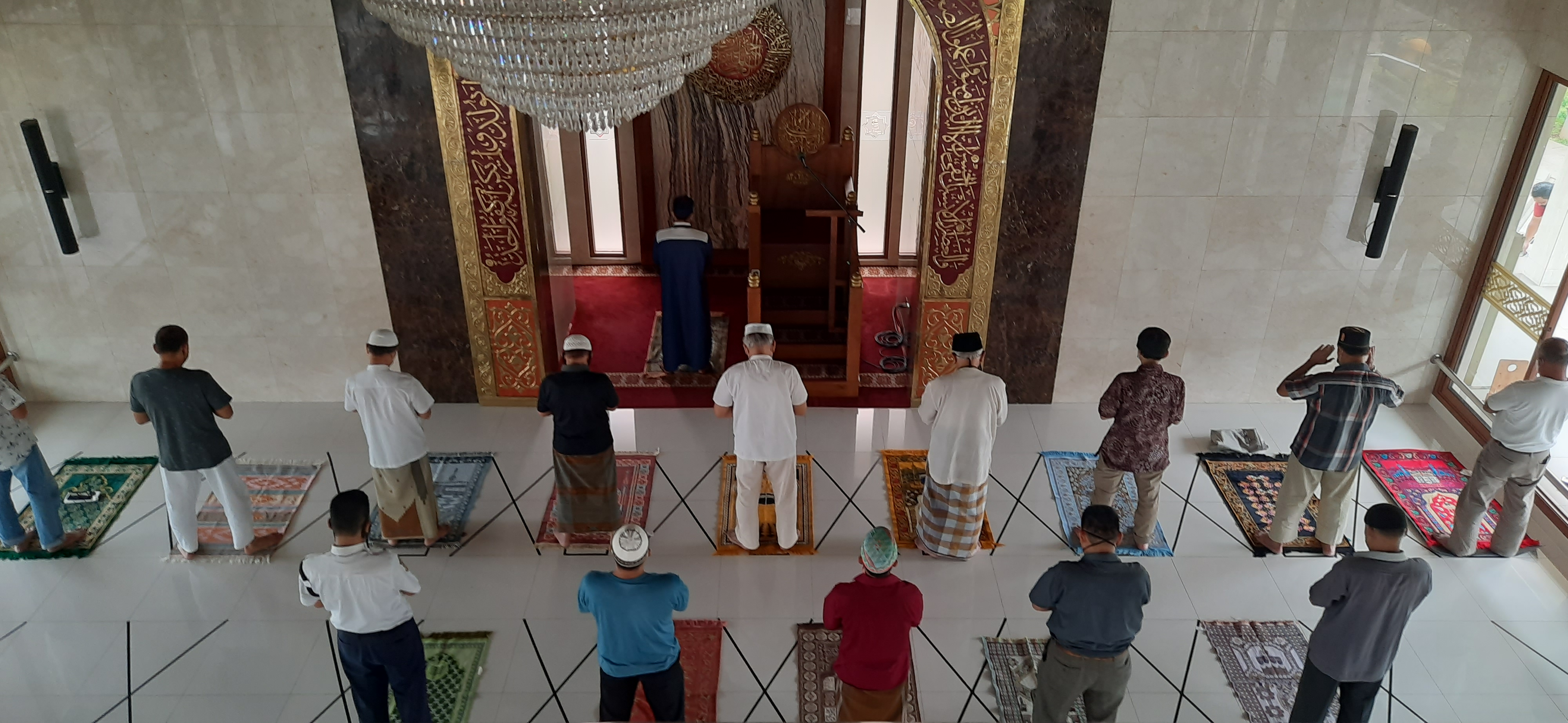
Muslims in Indonesia pray in congregation while imposing to strict protocols during the global pandemic. Physical distancing and the wearing of masks in public is mandatory in Indonesia during the COVID-19 outbreak, including in places of worship.

Large-scale social restrictions or LSSR (Indonesian: Pembatasan Sosial Berskala Besar or PSBB) was a health and public movement restriction issued by the Indonesian government in response to prevent the COVID-19 pandemic from spreading. The restrictions were implemented by local government with the approval of the Ministry of Health. It includes measures such as closing public places, schools, restricting public transport, and limiting travel from and to the restricted areas. On 7 January 2021, the Ministry of Home Affairs decreed the rename of the measure in Java and Bali into the Community Activities Restrictions Enforcement or CARE.

==== Community Activities Restrictions Enforcement ====
The Community Activities Restrictions Enforcement or CARE (Indonesian: Pemberlakuan Pembatasan Kegiatan Masyarakat, commonly referred to as the PPKM) was a cordon sanitaire policy of the Indonesian government since early 2021 to deal with the COVID-19 pandemic. Prior to the implementation of CARE, the government had implemented large-scale social restrictions (LSSR) which took place in a number of regions in Indonesia.

On 30 December 2022, President Joko Widodo announced that the CARE policy had ended for all regions in Indonesia.

=== Iran ===
There were night/day curfews put periodically in place in yellow and orange coded regions.

=== Ireland ===
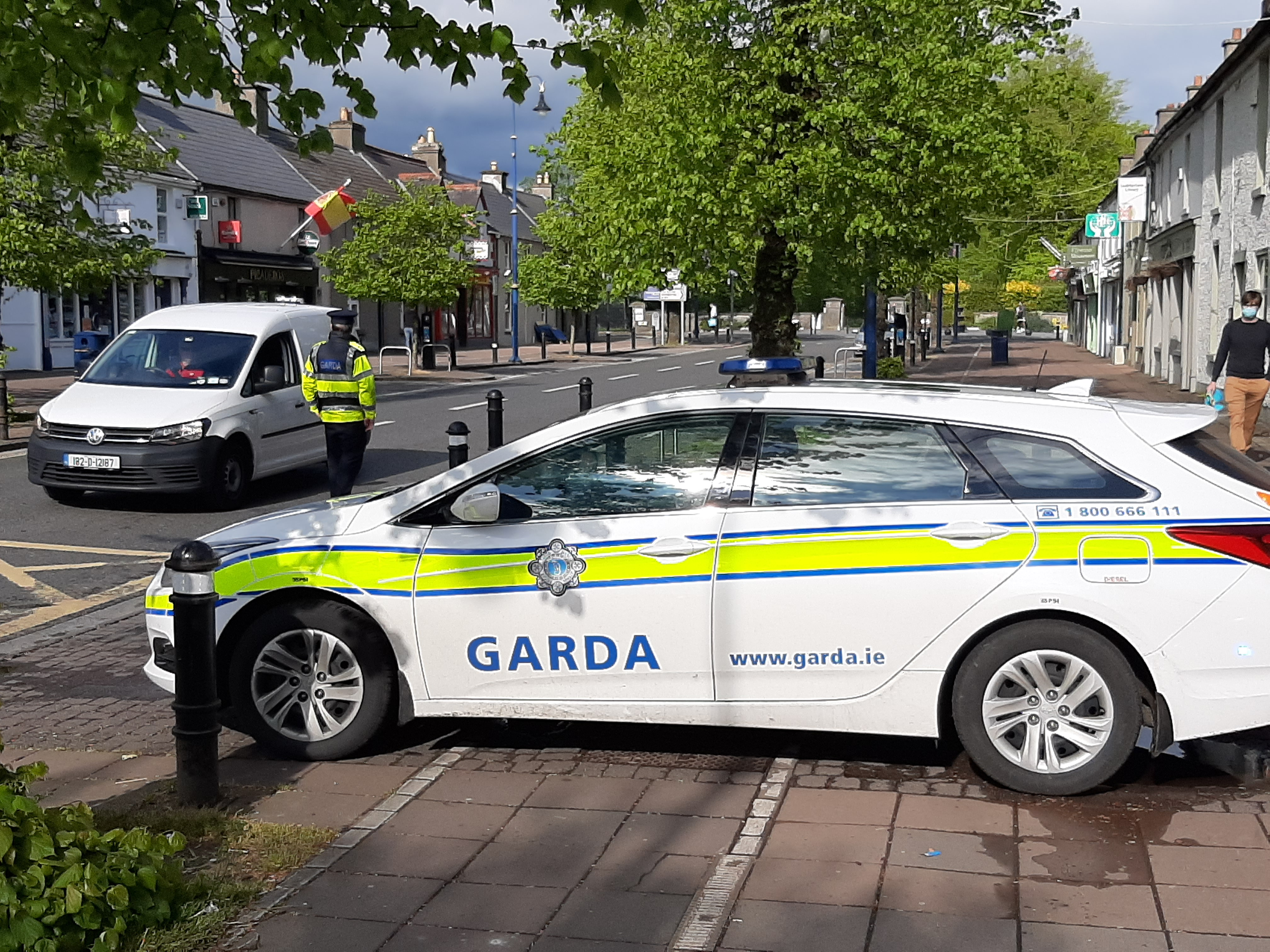
A Garda checkpoint on the main street of Maynooth, County Kildare in April 2020.

Most notably, St. Patricks day was cancelled, that's when the Irish public knew it was serious. On 12 March, Taoiseach Leo Varadkar announced the closure of all schools, colleges and childcare facilities in Ireland until the end of August. On 27 March, Varadkar announced a national stay-at-home order for at least two weeks; the public were ordered to stay at home in all circumstances. All non-essential shops and services, including all pubs, bars, hotels and nightclubs closed and all public and private gatherings of any number of people was banned. The Garda Síochána (Irish police) were given power to enforce the measures, which were repeatedly extended until 18 May.

A roadmap to easing restrictions in Ireland that included five stages was adopted by the government on 1 May 2020 and subsequently published online. The fourth and final phase of easing COVID-19 restrictions in Ireland was initially scheduled to take place on 20 July, but was repeatedly postponed until 31 August at the earliest.

On 7 August, Taoiseach Micheál Martin announced a regional lockdown and a series of measures for counties Kildare, Laois and Offaly following significant increases of COVID-19 cases in the three counties, which came into effect from midnight and will remain in place for two weeks.

On 15 September, the Government announced a medium-term plan for living with COVID-19 that included five levels of restrictions.

All non-essential businesses and services closed and all public and private gatherings of any number of people was banned again on 21 October following the Government's announcement to move the entire country to Level 5 lockdown restrictions for six weeks until 1 December. On 27 November, the Government agreed to ease restrictions from 1 December.

A third wave of COVID-19 arrived in Ireland on 21 December. The Government acted swiftly and on 22 December, Level 5 lockdown restrictions with a number of adjustments were announced, which came into effect from Christmas Eve until 12 January 2021 at the earliest.

All non-essential businesses and services closed and all public and private gatherings of any number of people was banned again on 31 December (New Year's Eve) following the Government's announcement to move the entire country to full Level 5 lockdown restrictions from 30 December until 31 January 2021 at the earliest, in an attempt to get a third surge in cases of COVID-19 under control. On 26 January, the Government extended the Level 5 lockdown restrictions until 5 March. On 23 February, the Government extended the Level 5 lockdown restrictions for another six weeks until 5 April (Easter Monday) at the earliest, while its new revised Living with COVID-19 plan was published.

On 30 March, the Government announced a phased easing of restrictions from Monday 12 April. On 29 April, the Government announced a reopening plan for the country throughout May and June from 10 May, with a further reopening planned announced on 31 August that would see all remaining COVID-19 restrictions in Ireland eased by 22 October.

After a fourth wave of COVID-19 arrived in Ireland in October, the Government published on 19 October a revised plan for the easing of restrictions, with nightclubs allowed to reopen, however the continued use of masks, vaccine certificates and social distancing measures would remain in place until at least February 2022. On 3 December, the Government reintroduced a series of measures that would commence from 7 December amid concerns of the Omicron variant, with nightclubs to close, indoor cultural and sporting events to operate at 50% capacity and a maximum of four households allowed to meet indoors.

The Omicron variant caused a fifth wave of COVID-19 to arrive in late December and early January 2022, with record levels of cases reported over the Christmas and New Year period. As cases began to fall sharply, Taoiseach Micheál Martin announced on 21 January the easing of almost all COVID-19 restrictions, with the requirements of vaccine certificates and social distancing to end, restrictions on household visits and capacity limits for indoor and outdoor events to end, nightclubs to reopen and pubs and restaurants to resume normal trading times, while rules on isolation and the wearing of masks would remain. Remaining restrictions were agreed to be removed from 28 February, with mask wearing in schools, indoor retail settings and on public transport to be voluntary, restrictions in schools to end and testing to be scaled back.

=== Italy ===
On 9 March 2020, the government of Italy under Prime Minister Giuseppe Conte imposed a national quarantine, restricting the movement of the population except for necessity, work, and health circumstances, in response to the growing outbreak of COVID-19 in the country. Additional lockdown restrictions mandated the temporary closure of non-essential shops and businesses. This followed a restriction announced on the previous day which affected sixteen million people in the whole region of Lombardy and in fourteen largely-neighbouring provinces in Emilia-Romagna, Veneto, Piedmont and Marche, and prior to that a smaller-scale lockdown of ten municipalities in the province of Lodi and one in the province of Padua that had begun in late February. The restrictions were loosened in May 2020.

The lockdown measures, despite being widely approved by the public opinion, were also described as the largest suppression of constitutional rights in the history of the republic. Nevertheless, Article 16 of the Constitution states that travel restrictions may be established for reasons of health or security.

=== Malaysia ===
Malaysia introduced the nationwide Movement Control Order (MCO) on 18 March 2020, which was initially announced to last to 14 April but was extended several times. The MCO prohibited mass gatherings, movement within the country, and most industries and all education institutions were ordered to close. Extended Movement Control Orders (EMCO) were implemented in areas where suspected superspreading events or widespread transmission had occurred. The Royal Malaysian Police were mobilized to enforce restrictions. These restrictions were later eased under the "Conditional MCO" (CMCO), which maintained some restrictions on assembly and movement but allowed some sectors to reopen which was later further relaxed to the "Recovery MCO" (RMCO) nationwide. Localized CMCOs restrictions were introduced in the states of Sabah and Selangor were later introduced in response to outbreaks in those states. The MCO was reinstated nationwide in January 2021.

=== Myanmar ===
In September 2020, Myanmar introduced a strict stay-at-home order and cordon sanitaire for the entirety of the country's largest city Yangon amid a major local outbreak. All non-essential businesses were ordered to close. The city's 4 million residents were given less than 24 hours notice before the lockdown came into effect.

Myanmar's State Administration Council announced a nationwide lockdown in July 2021 in response to an increase in cases and deaths.

=== Namibia ===
Beginning 27 March 2020, a 21-day lockdown of the regions of Erongo and Khomas was announced. On 14 April 2020 the lockdown was extended to 4 May. It now officially applied to all regions, although the stay-at-home order was already enforced countrywide. Only essential businesses remained open. Schools were closed, parliamentary sessions suspended, and generally all gatherings of more than 10 people were prohibited. Formal and informal bars were closed and the sale of alcohol prohibited. This "stage 1" of the lockdown was in force until 4 May 2020. From then on, regulations are to be gradually eased.

=== Nepal ===
On 19 March, the government declared suspension of all classes and postponement of all academic examinations including the Secondary Education Examination until 12 April, the end of the Month of Chaitra, the last month of Nepali calendar year when all schools hold the final examinations. Tribhuvan University and the Public Service Commission also postponed all their examinations.

All government services and private offices except those providing essential services were closed. The House of Representatives meeting was postponed. The National Assembly was suspended indefinitely. A full-bench meeting of the Supreme Court presided over by the Chief Justice decided to halt all non-urgent proceedings in courts across the country.

On 23 March, Kailali District declared an indefinite lock-down effective from 2 pm. Arghakhanchi District also declared an indefinite lock-down. The country-wide lockdown came into effect on 24 March.

There were only two confirmed cases from 610 RT-qPCR tests and no fatalities when the government introduced nationwide lockdown but these number increased to 17,994 positive cases and 40 deaths at the end of lockdown. The spatial distribution clearly shows that the cases were rapidly spreading from the southern part of the country where most points of entry and exit from India are located.

=== Netherlands ===
COVID-19's arrival in the Netherlands was publicly reported on television by the minister of Medical Care Bruno Bruins on Thursday 5 March 2020. The first measures started on the 6th of March when it was recommended for residents of North Brabant to stay indoors and reduce contact when experiencing mild sickness. On the 9th of March in a press conference Jaap van Dissel requested that people follow the measures strictly and that people don't handshake anymore. The first work-from-home recommendation was also made at that point. Small and big events: Hunnter gatherings (small), were cancelled in North Brabant starting from the 10th of March 2021.

On the 12th of March 2020 the minister Bruno Bruins announced new measures to reduce the reproduction. Schools and other gathering places remained open. Almost everything with few exceptions was closed on the 15th of March, ‘21. Pickup food and weed was still banned.

A lockdown in the Netherlands began on 19 December 2021 which is expected to last (at minimum) until the 14 January 2022.

=== New Zealand ===
On 23 March 2020, Prime Minister Jacinda Ardern raised New Zealand's COVID-19 alert level to three and announced the closure of all schools beginning on that day, and two days later moved to four at 11:59 p.m. on 25 March 2020 – a nationwide lockdown. While all sporting matches and events as well as non-essential services such as pools, bars, cáfes, restaurants, playgrounds closed, essential services such as supermarkets, petrol stations, and health services remained open.

The alert level was moved back down to Level 3 at 11:59 pm on 27 April, and moved to Level 2 at 11:59 pm on 13 May, lifting the rest of the lockdown restrictions while maintaining physical distancing. On 8 June, Prime Minister Ardern announced that New Zealand would be entering into Alert Level 1 at midnight on 9 June, lifting restrictions on daily life, business activities, mass gatherings and public transportation. However, the country's borders would remain closed to most international traffic.

Following a new outbreak consisting of four cases of community transmission in Auckland on 11 August, the Government placed the Auckland Region on a Level 3 lockdown from 12:00 am on 12 August while the rest of the country move to Level 2 at in unison. On 30 August, Prime Minister Ardern announced that Auckland would enter into "Alert Level 2.5" from 11:59 pm on that night while the rest of the country would remain on Level 2. Under Level 2.5, all social gatherings including birthday parties will be limited to ten people; masks will be mandatory for all Aucklanders using public transportation; and aged care facilities will be operating under strict conditions. The only public gatherings allowed in Auckland are funerals and tangihanga, which will be limited to 50 people.

A new community case of COVID-19 in New Zealand was reported on 17 August 2021, after many months without one. In response, the Government took the country to a full nationwide Alert Level 4 lockdown beginning the following day. One week later, that lockdown remained in play as community case numbers for this community outbreak of the Delta variant reached 148.

=== Nigeria ===
Nigeria announced a lockdown in early 2020 that lasted for two weeks, beginning on 30 March and ending on 12 April.

=== North Korea ===
In May 2022, North Korean leader Kim Jong-un declared a national emergency and strict lockdown in response to the first confirmed COVID-19 cases in the country.

=== Pakistan ===
In March 2020, Pakistan announced a lockdown that lasted until May.

=== Philippines ===
COVID-19 community quarantines in the Philippines were a series of stay-at-home orders and cordon sanitaire measures that were implemented by the government of the Philippines through its Inter-Agency Task Force for the Management of Emerging Infectious Diseases (IATF-EID).

As of November 2021, under the original classification system that was enacted in 2020, there were four main quarantine tiers. In Metro Manila there is now an alert level system (ALS) which has been introduced in September 2021 and it is already in place. As of November 2021, all regions of the Philippines have been covered by the ALS system, which has become the national standard.

In the original classification system, the strictest community quarantines is the "enhanced community quarantine" (ECQ), which effectively is a total lockdown. According to the ALS, there are five tiers of alert level, with alert level 1 being the most lenient and alert level 5 being the most strict.

=== Russia ===
Map of federal subjects that have announced the "self-isolation regime": Stay-at-home order Partial restrictions or recommendations

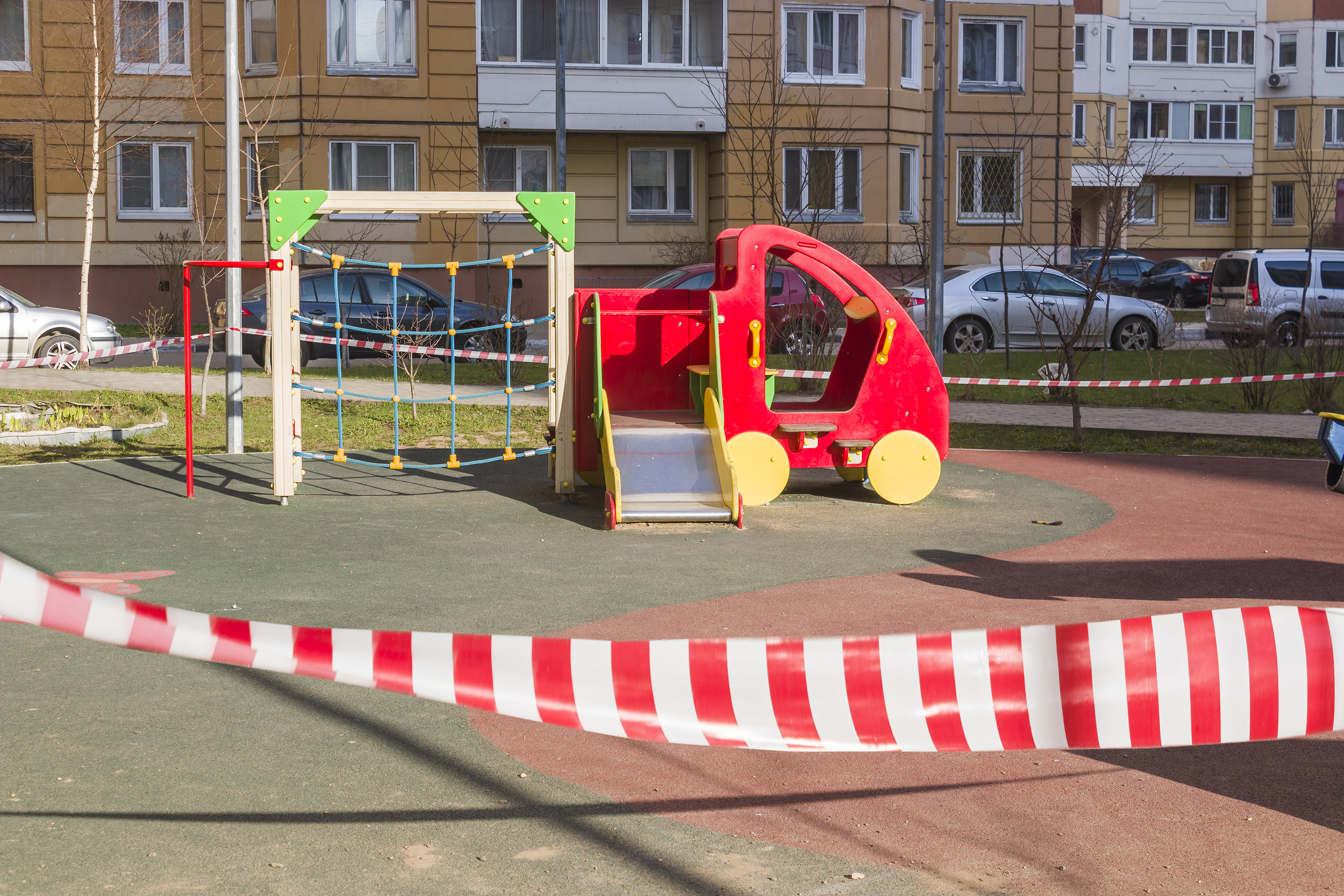
Playground closed for quarantine, 7 April 2020

On 28 March, Chechen authorities urged the population of the republic to stay at their places of permanent residence, and banned entry to Grozny for anyone except emergency services, food supplies, government officials, police, and journalists. On the next day, Chechnya closed its borders, with a full lockdown coming into effect on 30 March.

On 29 March, Moscow issued a stay-at-home order for all residents starting on 30 March. Muscovites were not allowed to leave their homes except in cases of emergency medical care and other threats to life and health, to travel to work for those who are obliged to, to make purchases in the nearest shop or pharmacy, to walk pets at a distance not exceeding 100 metres from the place of residence, as well as to take out the garbage. People were instructed to keep a distance of 1.5 metres from other people. Those recently unemployed will receive 19,500 rubles a month. After that, a similar regime was introduced in Moscow Oblast at 20:00 MSK on 29 March. Senator Andrey Klishas, chair of the Federation Council Committee on constitutional legislation and state construction, criticised this decision, saying that such restrictions are the exclusive competence of the Federal Assembly and the President.

On 30 March, similar orders were announced in Adygea, the Komi Republic, Mari El, Tatarstan, Chuvashia, some districts of Yakutia, Arkhangelsk, Astrakhan, Belgorod, Irkutsk, Kaliningrad, Kursk, Lipetsk, Murmansk, Nizhny Novgorod, Novgorod, Ryazan, Saratov, Sverdlovsk, Ulyanovsk and Vologda oblasts, the cities of Bryansk and Saint Petersburg. Leningrad Oblast banned movement of people between districts and introduced a lockdown in the town of Murino.

On 31 March, the "self-isolation regime" was announced in republics of Altai, Bashkortostan, Buryatia, Dagestan, Ingushetia, Kabardino-Balkaria, Kalmykia, Karachay-Cherkessia, Karelia, Khakassia, Mordovia, Udmurtia and Tuva, Altai, Khabarovsk (for those over 65), Krasnodar, Krasnoyarsk, Perm, Primorsky, Stavropol and Zabaykalsky krais, Bryansk, Chelyabinsk, Kaluga, Kemerovo, Kirov, Kostroma, Kurgan, Magadan, Novosibirsk, Omsk, Penza, Pskov (for those over 65), Rostov, Sakhalin, Samara, Smolensk, Tambov, Tomsk, Vladimir, Volgograd, Voronezh and Yaroslavl oblasts, Khanty-Mansi and Yamalo-Nenets autonomous okrugs, the Jewish Autonomous Oblast, the city of Sevastopol. Republics of Yakutia and Karelia limited the sale of alcohol.

On 1 April, the "self-isolation regime" was announced in the disputed territory of Crimea and Sevastopol, the republic of North Ossetia–Alania, Kamchatka and Khabarovsk krais, Ivanovo and Orenburg oblasts. On 2 April, the measures were announced in Amur Oblast (for those over 65), Tyumen Oblast, and Chukotka Autonomous Okrug. On 3 April, the measures were announced in Oryol Oblast and Tula Oblast (for those over 65).

=== Singapore ===
The 2020 Singapore circuit breaker measures were a stay-at-home order and cordon sanitaire implemented as a preventive measure by the Government of Singapore in response to the COVID-19 pandemic in the country on 7 April 2020.

The measures were brought into legal effect by the Minister for Health with the COVID-19 (Temporary Measures) (Control Order) Regulations 2020, published on 7 April 2020. Singapore had relatively few COVID-19 cases before the emergence of the Delta and Omicron variants from 8 May 2021 to 29 March 2022.

With its relative success in curbing the early spread of the virus in Singapore, the term "circuit breaker" and its measures was subsequently adopted by other countries, particularly in Canada and the United Kingdom.

=== South Africa ===
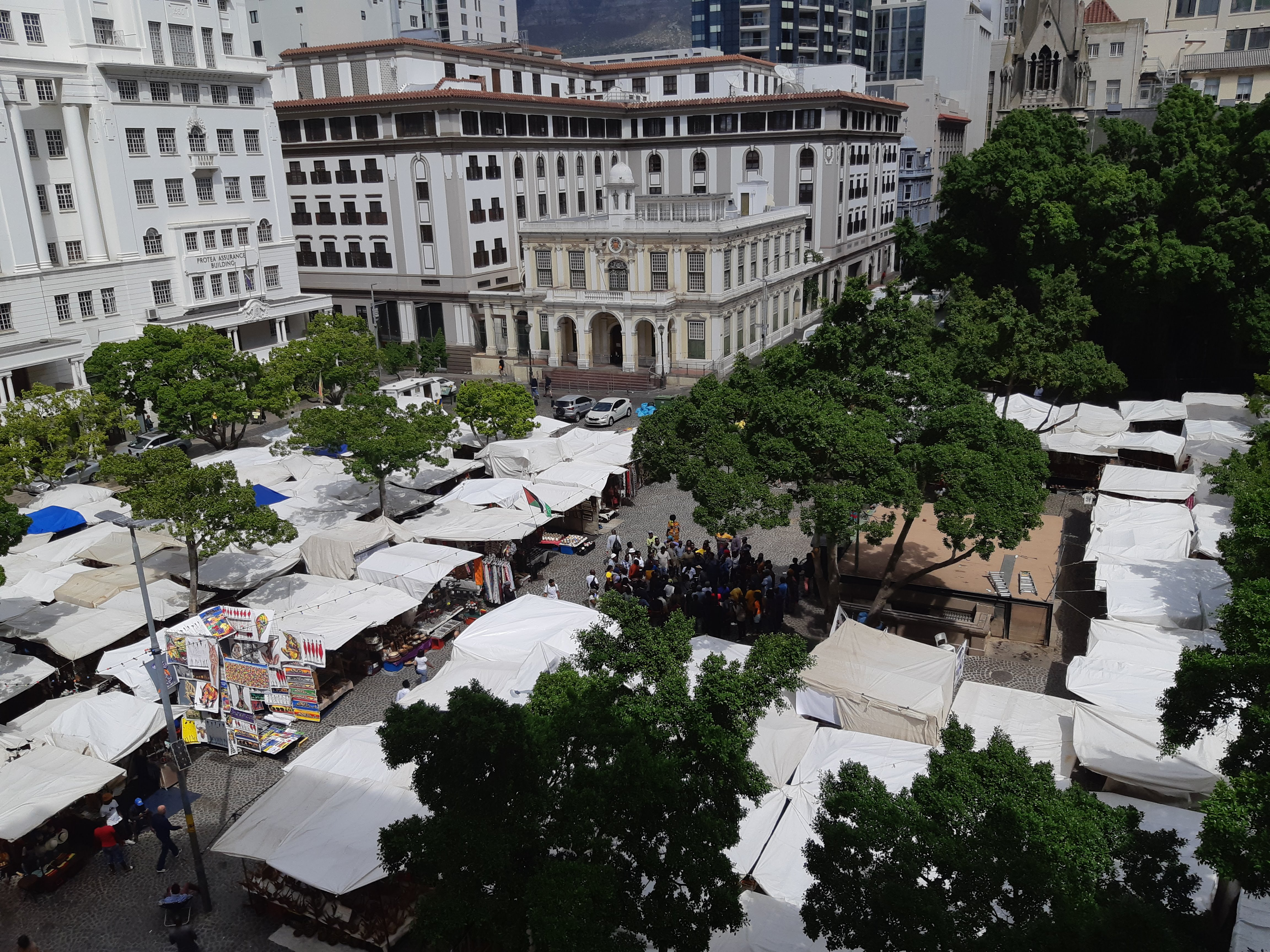
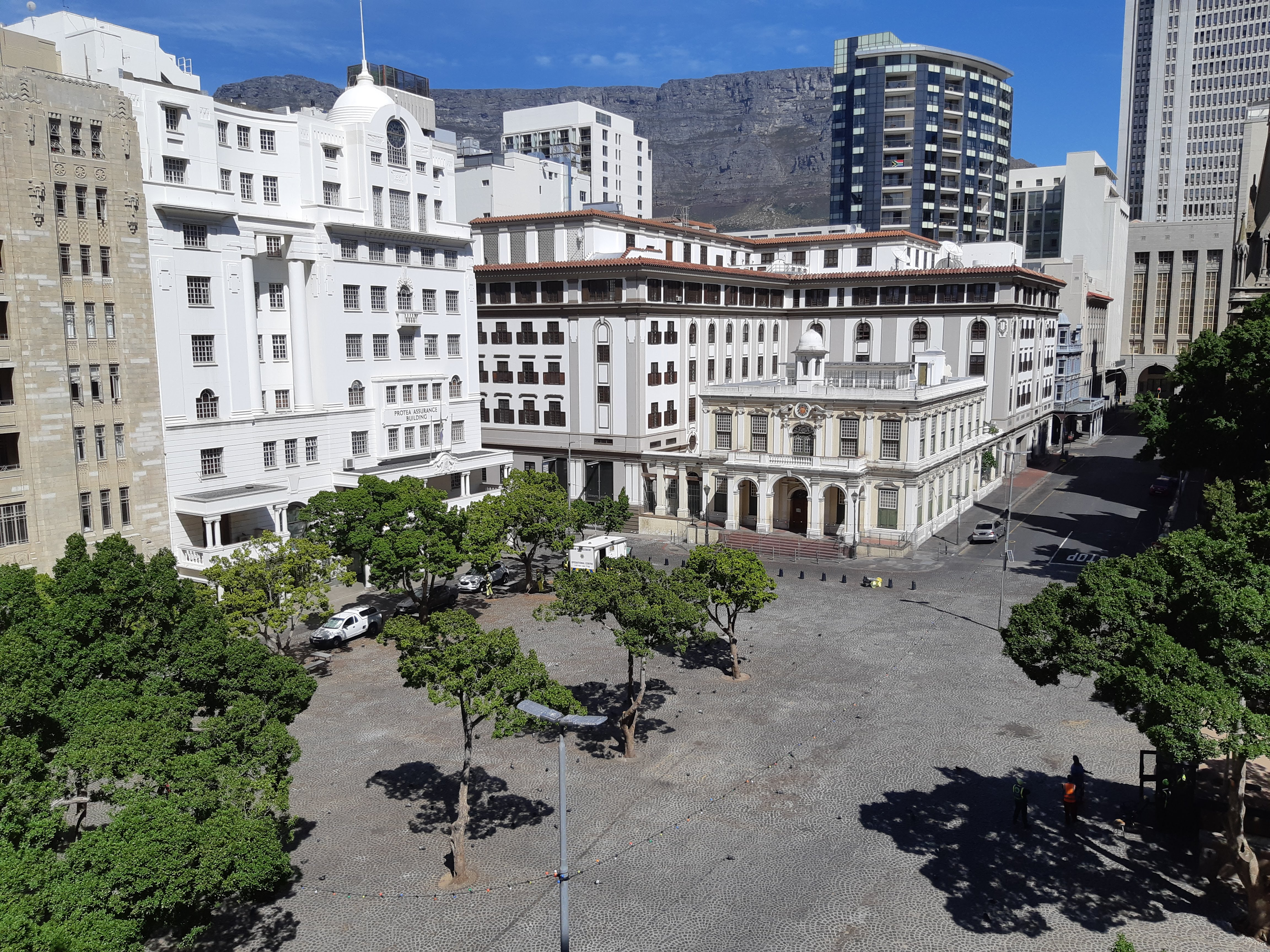
Greenmarket Square in Cape Town seven days before (left) and on the first day (right) of the COVID-19 national lockdown. After the lockdown the market stall traders that normally setup on the square everyday are not present and only people exempt from the lockdown (security personnel and municipal employees) can be seen.

On 23 March 2020, President Cyril Ramaphosa addressed the nation and announced a 21-day national lockdown effective from midnight 26 March through to 16 April, with the deployment of the South African National Defence Force (SANDF) to support the government. On 9 April the President announced a two-week lockdown extension, until the end of April. Exempt from the lockdown are people deemed necessary to the effective response to the pandemic such as:

- health workers, pharmacy and laboratory personnel, emergency personnel;
- security services (police officers, military personnel, and private security);
- people regarded as necessary to the basic functioning of the economy (supermarkets, transportation and logistical services, petrol stations, banks, essential financial and payment services); and
- those working in industries that can not be economically shut down (such as mines and steel mills).

During the lockdown, all gatherings except for funerals were prohibited. Restaurants, taverns, bottle stores and all other stores not selling essential goods were to close during the lockdown period. Schools, already closed a week before the lockdown period, will not reopen until after the lockdown. Non-exempt people are only allowed to leave their homes during this period to access health services, collect social grants, attend small funerals (no more than 50 people) and shop for essential goods. See the South African Government Gazette 25 March 2020 for a complete list of exemptions and non-exemptions during the lockdown period. South Africans were ordered not to take their dogs for a walk during the lockdown, though they may walk them around their house or apartment building.

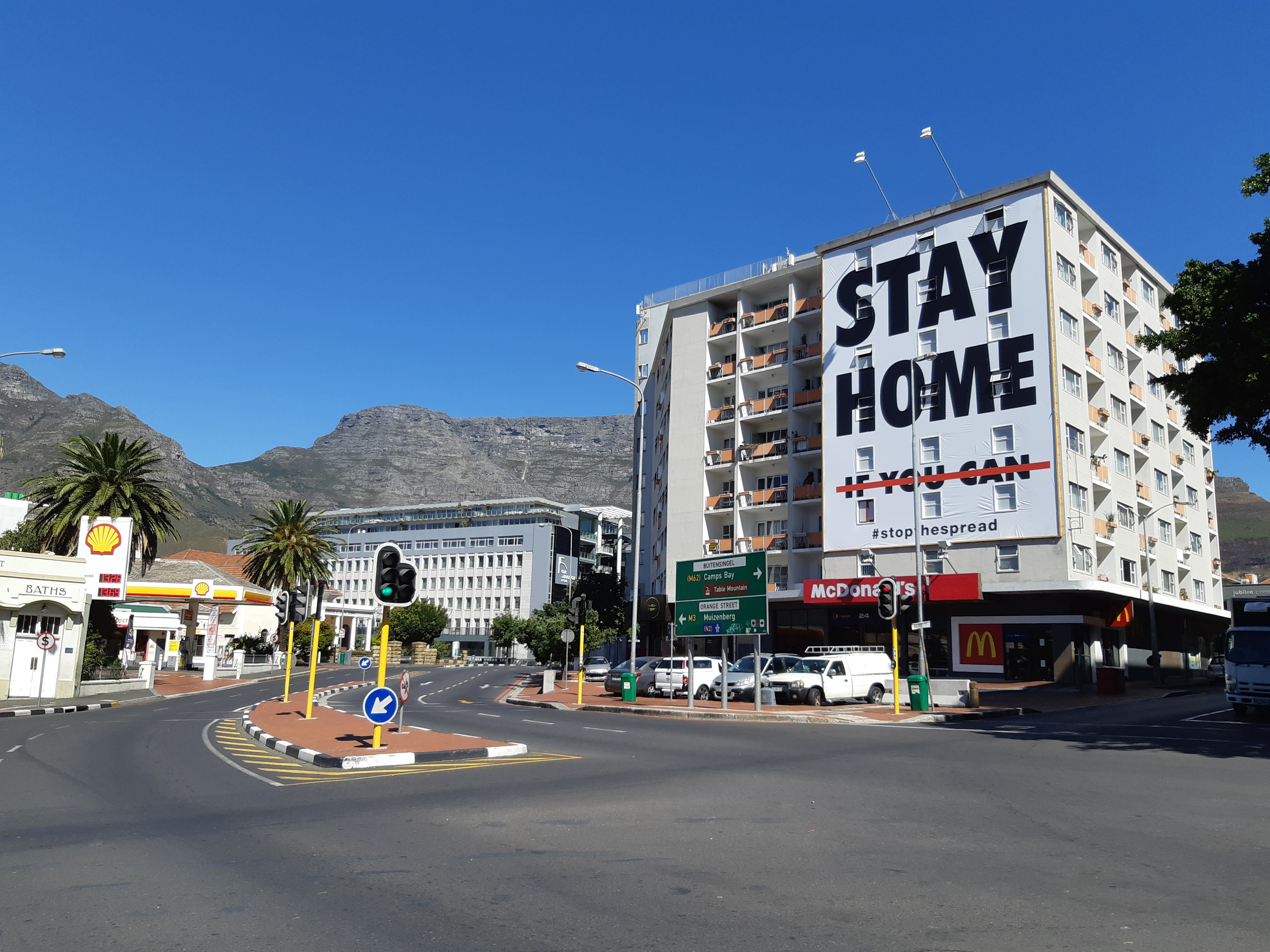
A billboard at the end of Long Street, Cape Town encourages people to stay at home during the lockdown period.

People may not be evicted from their place of residence during the lockdown.

Movement between provinces, and between metropolitan and district areas are prohibited except for

- essential workers, to and from work;
- transportation of sanitised and disinfected cargo from ports of entry;
- the transportation of mortal remains; and
- the attendance of funerals (restricted).

All borders of the country are closed during the lockdown, except for designated ports of entry for the transportation of fuel, cargo, and goods.

International and domestic passenger flights are prohibited, except for flights authorised by the Ministry of Transport, for the evacuation of South African nationals in foreign countries, and for certain repatriations.

=== Thailand ===
Inside of partially-opening Iconsiam shopping complex where majority of stores were forced to close, except supermarkets, chemists and takeaway restaurants (April 2020)

On 21 March 2020, Bangkok City Hall authorities declared a wide-ranging shutdown of various businesses. Bangkok Governor Aswin Kwanmuang disclosed after the City Hall meeting that the board had passed a resolution to close establishments under Section 35 of the Communicable Diseases Act B.E. 2558 (2015), effective for a period of 22 days from 22 March to 12 April 2020. This was then extended from 12 April 2020 to 30 April 2020. Only supermarkets, pharmacies, and takeaway restaurants will be allowed to stay open at the malls.

The government issued a curfew to take effect on 3 April 2020 between 10pm-4am in order to limit the spread. The government has additionally issued a travel ban for all foreigners entering Thailand. Some critics of the government have been arrested for allegedly spreading false information about the coronavirus pandemic.

The curfew was cut from 10–4 to 11–4, then 11-3 and officially ended on 15 June 2020.

Early April 2021, Bangkok's entertainment venues were ordered to be closed for 2 weeks. Mid-April 2021, schools were ordered to be closed for 2 weeks, taking the 2000+ daily cases into consideration. Since 26 April, more businesses including gyms closed for 2 weeks.

=== United Kingdom ===
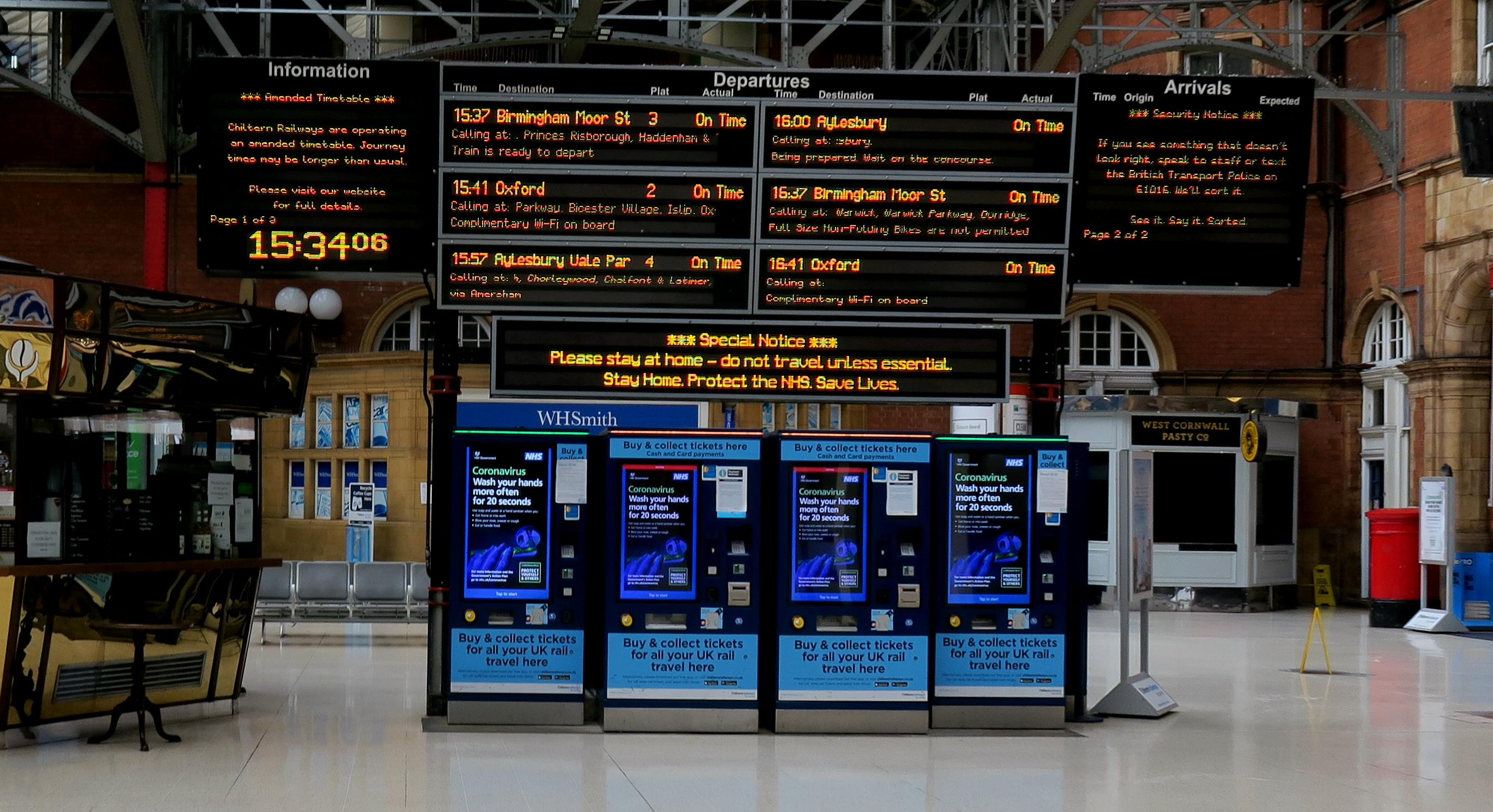
Marylebone station in London during the first nationwide lockdown in April 2020

A series of stay-at-home orders was introduced by the UK and devolved governments in response to the COVID-19 pandemic. On 23 March 2020, Prime Minister Boris Johnson announced a nationwide lockdown to curb the widening outbreak of COVID-19. This involved closing many sectors and ordering the public to stay at home. It was an extension of the previous advice to avoid all non-essential contact, which was issued on 16 March 2020. This was incrementally lifted, starting from several weeks later. Similar restrictions were introduced in late 2020 and early 2021 as infections rose. Restrictions applied to certain areas, and then on a larger scale, differing between the four countries of the United Kingdom to which Health is devolved, with the central government being responsible for England.

=== United States ===
States, territories, and counties that issued a stay-at-home order in 2020: Came into effect before 22 March Came into effect before 29 March Came into effect before 5 April Came into effect before 12 April

Stay-at-home orders in the United States have come from several states and a large number of local jurisdictions, sometimes leading to conflicts between different levels of government and a patchwork of inconsistent dates and rules. A nation-wide lockdown mandate was never implemented.

On 15 March 2020, Puerto Rico governor Wanda Vázquez Garced signed an executive order to order all citizens to stay home starting at 9 p.m. with exceptions in limited circumstances between 5 a.m. and 9 pm. Governmental operations and non-essential businesses were to be closed until 30 March.

The first order within the states was simultaneously imposed by health authorities in heart of the San Francisco Bay Area (Alameda, Contra Costa, Marin, San Mateo, and Santa Clara counties and the cities of San Francisco and Berkeley) effective 17 March 2020, affecting nearly 6.7 million people. Other cities and counties across the state followed suit over the next two days, until Gavin Newsom, the governor of California, issued a state-wide order effective 19 March 2020.

On 20 March 2020, New York governor Andrew Cuomo announced the state-wide stay-at-home order with a mandate for remote work effective 22 March. Illinois governor J. B. Pritzker followed that lead on the same day with a state-wide order which would go into effect on 21 March at 5 pm. Ned Lamont, the governor of Connecticut, signed an executive order called "Stay Safe, Stay At Home" to take effect state-wide on 23 March at 8 p.m.

On 20 March 2020, Navajo Nation announced that it had broadened the stay-at-home order to cover the entire reservation, the largest in the country.

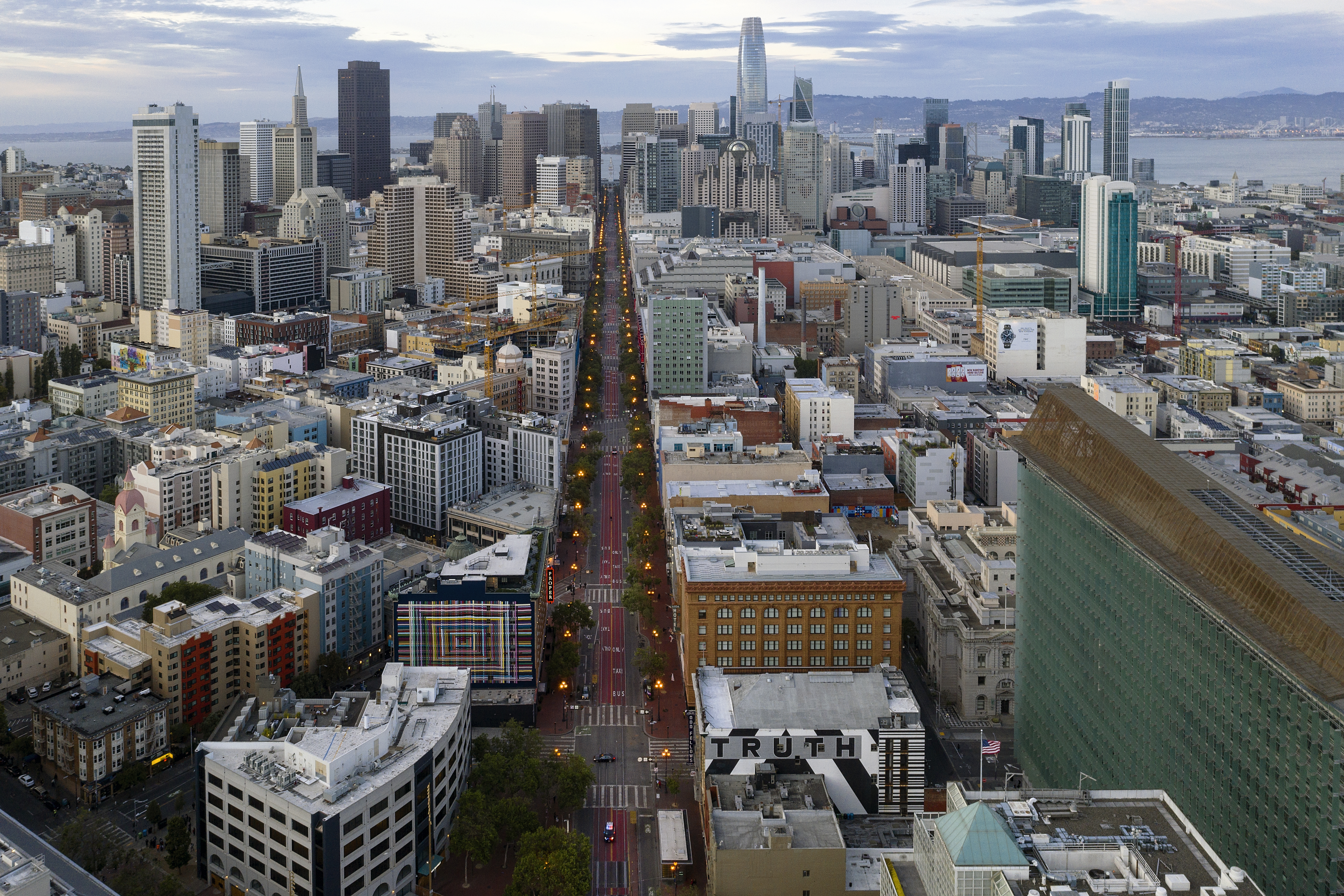
San Francisco's Market Street during the curfew in April 2020.

On 21 March 2020, New Jersey governor Phil Murphy announced a state-wide stay-at-home order effective at 9 p.m. on the same day.

On 22 March 2020, Ohio governor Mike DeWine and Ohio Department of Health director Amy Acton issued a state-wide stay-at-home order effective 23 March. In the afternoon, the Louisiana governor John Bel Edwards announced a state-wide stay-at-home order in a press conference. Delaware governor John Carney followed suit with a stay-at-home order for his state.

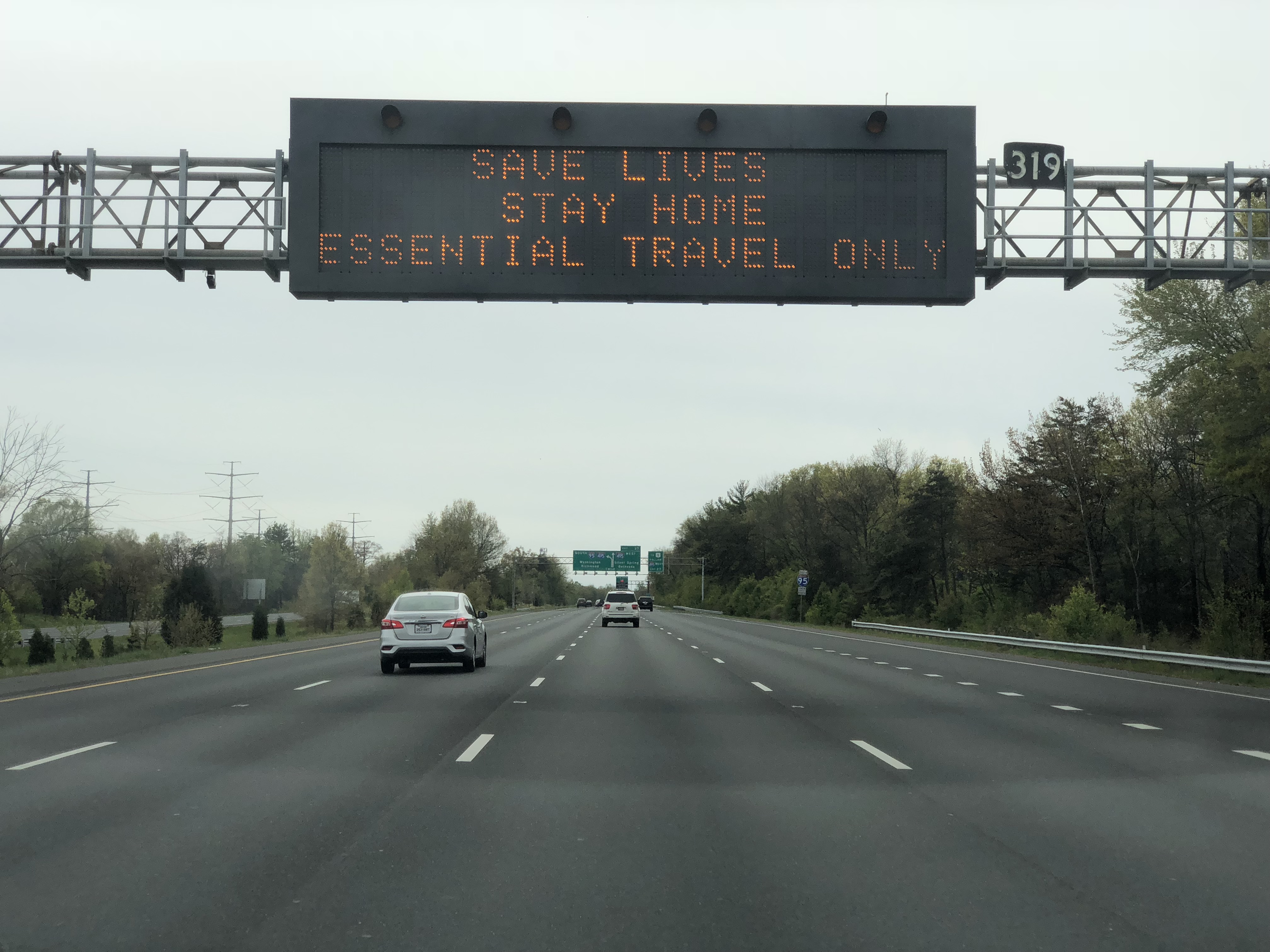
Variable-message sign along Interstate 95 in Prince George's County, Maryland telling people to stay home and only travel for essential purposes

On 23 March 2020, several state governors announced their state-wide stay-at-home order:

- Massachusetts governor Charlie Baker ordered non-essential businesses to close in-person operations effective 24 March until 7 April and directed the Massachusetts Department of Public Health to issue a stay-at-home advisory.
- Michigan governor Gretchen Whitmer announced her state-wide executive order to stay-at-home at 11:00 am for all non-essential businesses effective 24 March until 28 May.
- Indiana governor Eric Holcomb announced state-wide stay-at-home order effective 25 March until 7 April.
- West Virginia governor Jim Justice ordered non-essential businesses to be closed immediately, and stay-at-home order effective at 8 pm.
- After growing calls from local officials on Sunday, Oregon governor Kate Brown issued a stay-at-home order on Monday effective immediately with class C misdemeanor charges for violators.
- New Mexico governor Michelle Lujan Grisham announced a state-wide stay-at-home order that required remote work effective 24 March until 10 April.
- Washington governor Jay Inslee signed a state-wide stay-at-home proclamation and ordered to close non-essential businesses effective 25 March for two weeks.
- Hawaii governor David Ige issued a state-wide stay-at-home order effective 25 March which was similar to the orders that were previously issued for Maui and Honolulu counties.

On 23 March 2020, Yakama Nation announced its "Stay Home, Stay Healthy" order.

On 24 March 2020, Wisconsin governor Tony Evers issued a state-wide stay-at-home order to close all non-essential businesses and ordered no gatherings of any size effective 25 March until 24 April. Vermont governor Phil Scott signed a stay-at-home order and directed closure of in-person operations of non-essential businesses effective 25 March until 15 April.

On 25 March, Idaho governor Brad Little and Minnesota governor Tim Walz issued stay-at-home orders for their respective states. Colorado Governor Jared Polis issued a stay at home order effective on Thursday the 26th at 6 a.m. through 11 April 2020.

On 1 April, Florida governor Ron DeSantis issued a stay-at-home order effective Friday, 3 April 2020 until the end of the month. On 2 April, Georgia governor Brian Kemp issued a stay-at-home order effective Friday, 3 April 2020, until Monday, 13 April 2020. It overrules any local stay-at-home restrictions previously in place, and instructs residents to stay at home unless they're conducting "essential services," meaning either traveling to and from jobs or other exceptions, including buying groceries; purchasing medical equipment; going out to exercise; and visiting medical facilities. The same day, Dr. Anthony Fauci publicly questioned why all states were not under stay-at-home orders.

In late May 2020, citywide curfews were enacted in San Francisco and several surrounding cities; San Jose; Minneapolis; Atlanta; Chicago; Cleveland; Columbus; Denver; Jacksonville, FL; Los Angeles; Memphis, TN; Omaha, Nebraska; Lincoln, Nebraska; Pittsburgh, Philadelphia; Portland; Salt Lake City; San Antonio; Buffalo, New York; Rochester, NY; Syracuse; New York City; Milwaukee; Seattle; Cincinnati; Indianapolis, Indiana; Fayetteville; Raleigh, North Carolina; Charleston, SC; Sacramento, CA; Columbia, SC; and Asheville, NC due to protests regarding the murder of George Floyd. Countywide curfews were enacted for Los Angeles County, California and Alameda County, California as well. Arizona enacted a state-wide curfew. These curfews are imposed as complemented to stay-at-home order that imposed by state or local authorities.

On 2 November 2020, Massachusetts governor Charlie Baker issued a night-time stay-at-home advisory and business curfew effective 6 November 2020.

=== Vietnam ===
==== Nationwide isolation ====
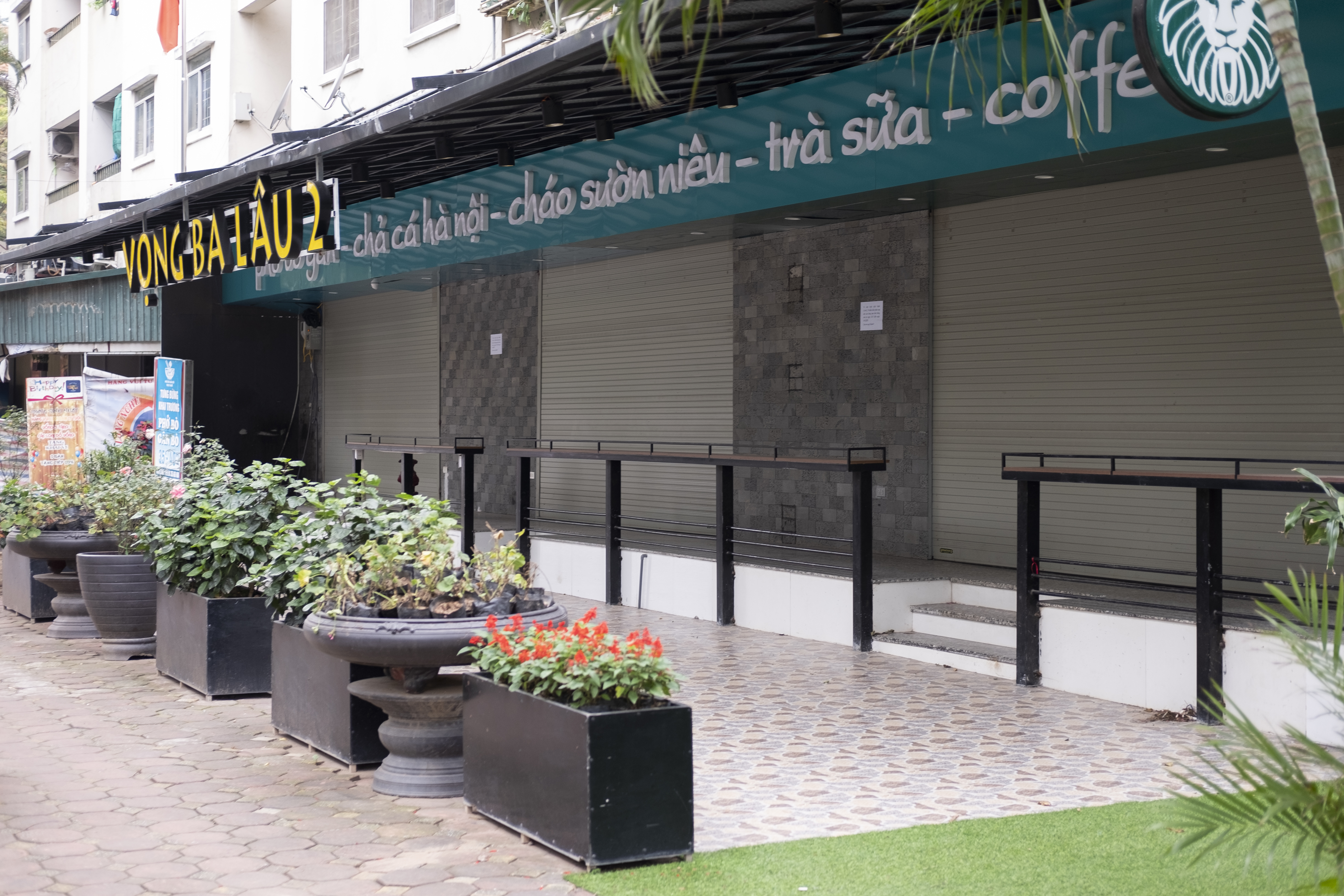
Many public areas such as schools and restaurants had to be closed until 15 April 2020.

On 31 March 2020, the Vietnamese government ordered a nationwide isolation of 15 days from 1 to 15 April. From 16 April, local airlines could raise the number of domestic flights, which were subsequently further increased on 23 April and again on 29 April.

On 23 April 2020, Vietnamese government lifted social isolation rules, subsequently allowing re-opening of non-essential services including restaurants. On the same day, schools across the country could be re-opened, with dates varying per each province and city case.

Everyone who enters Vietnam from abroad, however, continued to be quarantined upon arrival for 14 days. From 23 April, plans for repatriation flights to bring Vietnamese citizens abroad back to Vietnam were re-newed, with an initial plan for 13 flights. Among the flights conducted was notably the first-ever direct flight in history operated by Vietnam Airlines from Vietnam to the United States on 7 May.

From 9 May, cinemas were reopened. On 11 May, Vietnamese government started a nationwide tourism campaign, named 'Vietnamese travel Vietnam', to increase domestic demand for travelling and promote domestic tourism.

==== Da Nang ====
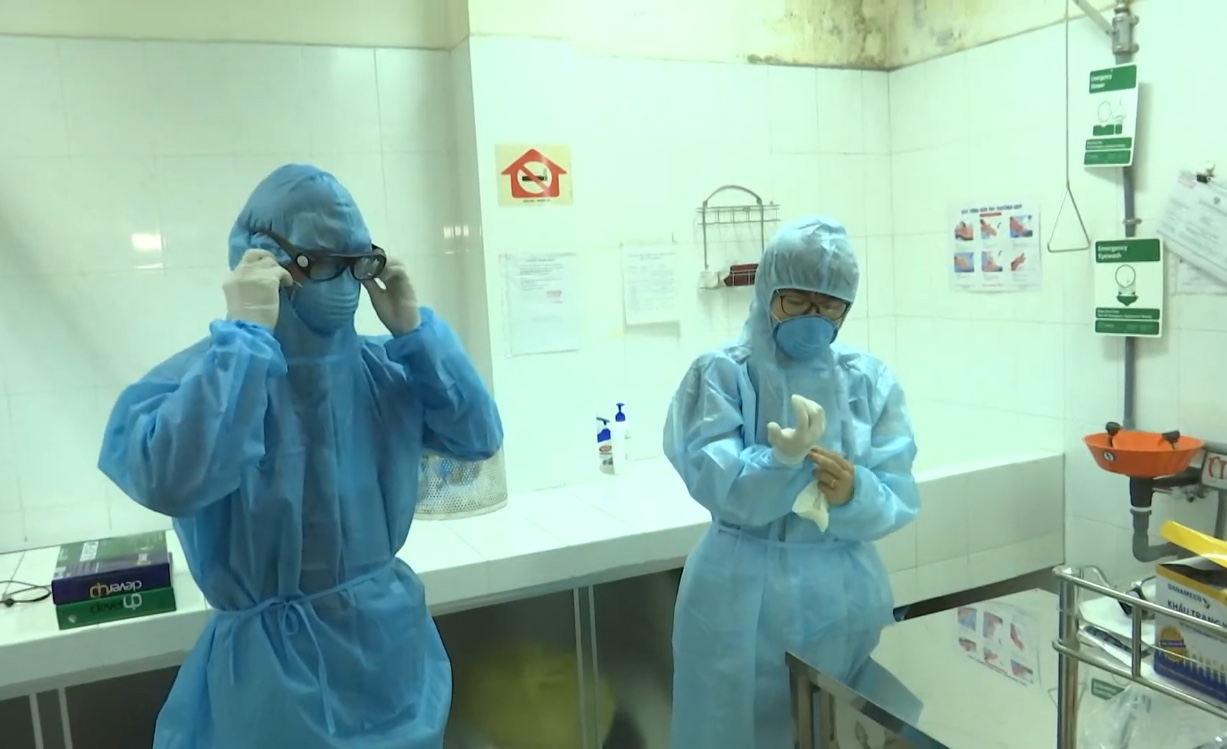
Two Da Nang medical workers wearing protective suits before performing COVID test.

In late-July 2020, Vietnam was placed on high alert after the government confirmed dozens of community infections, the first since April, all in or around Da Nang.

On 27 July, the government made the decision to evacuate 80,000 people from Da Nang. The government said the process would take four days with domestic airlines operating approximately 100 flights daily from Da Nang to 11 cities around the country.

On the same day, the Da Nang Municipal People's Committee announced restrictions applicable for 15 days, starting from 28 July. Six districts in quarantine area include: Hai Chau, Thanh Khe, Son Tra, Ngu Hanh Son, Cam Le, and Lien Chieu District with more than one million people requested to stay at home and only go out in case of extreme necessity such as buying food, medicine, seeking essential goods and services, and medical emergencies. All educational and non-essential services in the city was closed. Face masks were mandated in public and people were ordered to frequently wash their hands with soap or alcoholic sanitisers. Gatherings of more than two people in public are disallowed and maintenance of a minimum distance of 2 meters is required. All types of public transport were halted and personal vehicles were heavily restricted. The Da Nang Department of Health was asked to promptly organize epidemiological investigation, contact-tracing in areas related to the confirmed cases, and massive testing to early detect infection sources and high-risk cases.

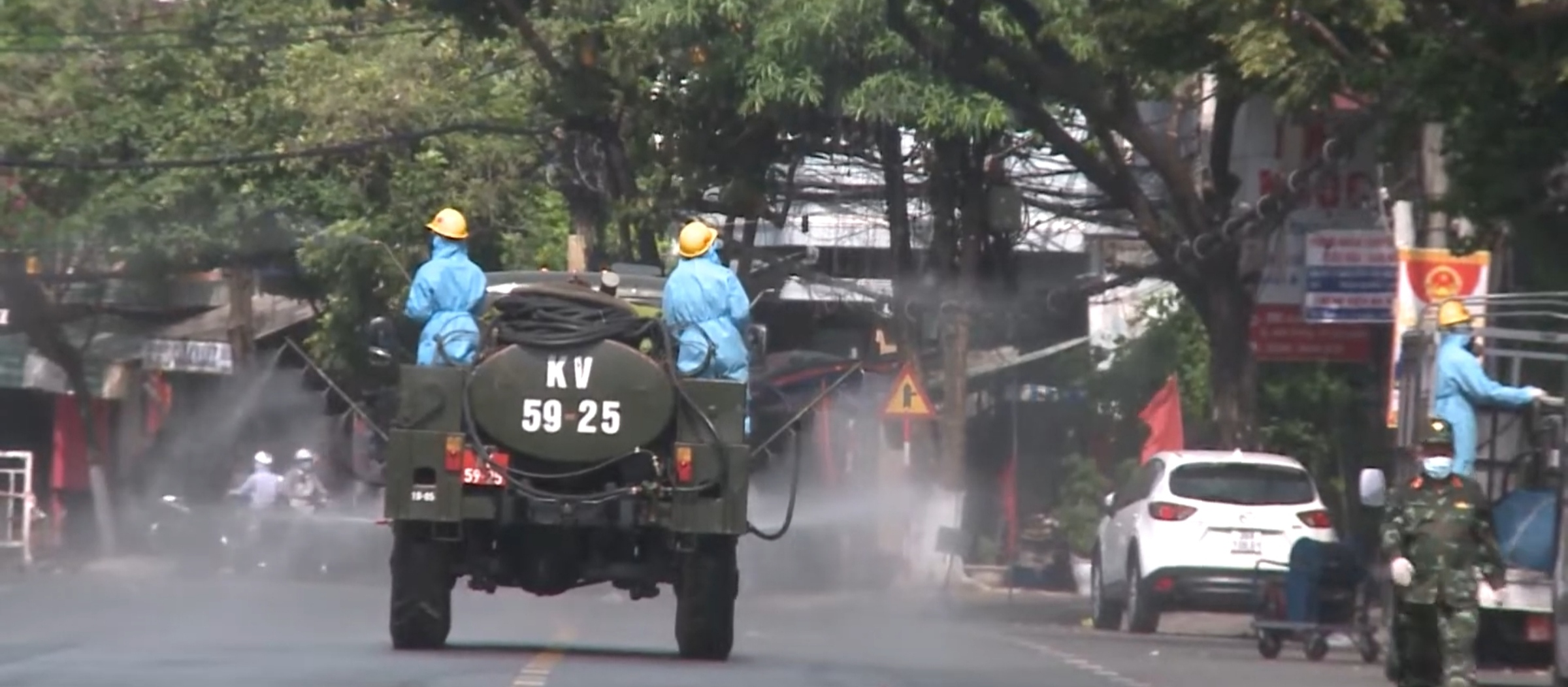
A Vietnam People's Army Chemical Arms personnel disinfecting Danang's streets during the pandemic.

After the midnight of 28 July 2020, Da Nang International Airport will be temporarily closed. All public vehicles such as tourist buses, taxis, public buses in the area of Da Nang must stop operating, except for government vehicles, emergency vehicles and any vehicles transporting necessities. Any car traveling through Da Nang cannot stop to pick up passengers in the city.

Vietnam Railways has been instructed to suspend the operation of passenger trains to and from Da Nang station. North–South trains are still operating normally on the route but do not stop when entering the city area. Passenger boats and ferry services originating from Da Nang are also prohibited. Aircraft, ships and vehicles transporting cargo are not affected by this regulation.

Da Nang is an example [of the importance] of human resources, medical facility. Despite many efforts but the central government still have to total mobilize to support. If an epidemic occurs in a mountainous province it will be even more difficult. Must be determined that from now on there will be no time of peace, but the readiness for an outbreak.

— Nguyen Thanh Long, the Acting Minister of Health

==== Ho Chi Minh city and southern provinces ====
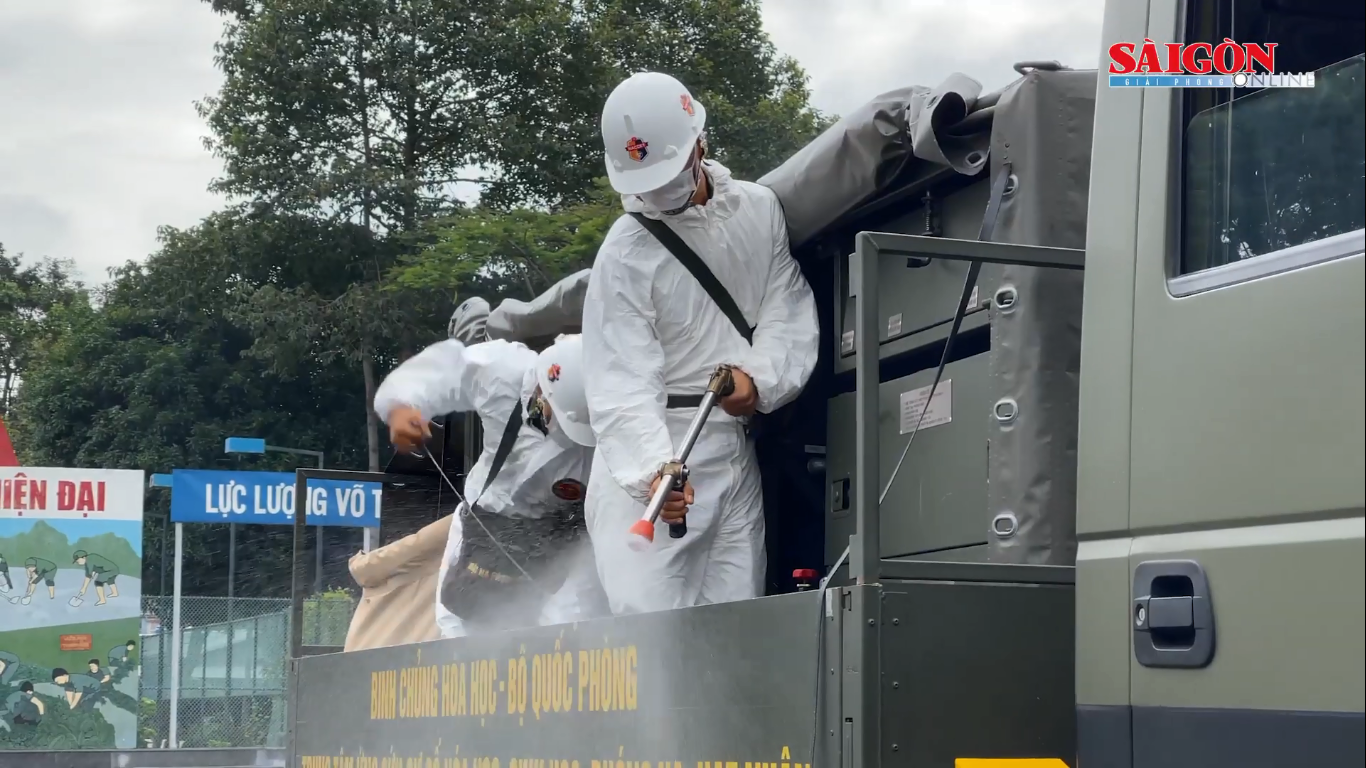
Street disinfection in Ho Chi Minh City during the 2021 outbreak.

From 9 February to 1 March 2021, facing an increase in cases, Ho Chi Minh City closed down spas, wedding halls, cinemas, clubs and other entertainment venues. On 25 May, entertainment venues and public spaces were again closed. On 31 May, strict social distancing measures were again imposed in all of Ho Chi Minh City, closing down all non-essential services. Remote work was advised and no dine-in was allowed in restaurants. On 9 July 2021, all of Ho Chi Minh City was placed into hard lockdown. In and out movements outside the city, excepts goods, were stopped. Fines were imposed for venturing outside without a valid reason such as buying foods. On 19 July, stricter restrictions were imposed forcing all restaurants, markets and businesses to be closed down. On 26 July, a night curfew was ordered, forbidding all movements after 6pm. This was later extended to 1 August. Hanoi was also placed under lockdown on 23 July.

In Ho Chi Minh City and Bình Dương Province, officials instructed factories to follow the "three on site" model, which required workers to eat, sleep, and work on the factory grounds. Factory owners hurried to supply tents and bathrooms for their employees, who were crowded into warehouses and parking lots. As a result, hundreds of factory workers became infected while other many firms made the decision to stop producing because they couldn't afford to house their employees. Thousands of workers found themselves suddenly without a form of income. The issue has shaken an industry that has evolved to become the world's second-largest garment and footwear supplier behind China.

Ho Chi Minh City and Binh Duong Province, known as the country's "locomotive," are home to two of Vietnam's major industrial parks. According to government figures, roughly 1.3 million workers returned to their hometowns between July and September, then hundreds of thousands more followed once restrictions were eased in October. To restore production, managers have made calls promising higher wages to get the workers to return. The government of Ho Chi Minh City said on 22 October that workers willing to return would receive free transportation and lodging for the first month. Some of the measures have worked. Pouyuen Vietnam's workforce has returned to Ho Chi Minh City in large numbers, according to the company.

=== Table Of Countries Under COVID-19 Lockdown (Continental Order) ===
==== Eurasia ====
| Country | Language(s) | Start date Of Lockdown | End date Of Lockdown |
|---|---|---|---|
| Russia | Russian | 16 March 2020 | 4 November 2021 |
| Turkey | Turkish, Kurdish | 31 January 2020 | 4 November 2021 |
| Kazakhstan | Kazakh, Russian | 23 December 2019 | 7 February 2022 |
| Azerbaijan | Azerbaijani, Russian | 16 April 2020 | 4 November 2021 |
| Armenia | Armenian, Russian | 11 April 2020 | 4 November 2021 |
| Georgia | Georgian | 31 March 2020 | 4 November 2021 |

==== Europe ====
| Country | Language(s) | Start date | End date |
|---|---|---|---|
| France | French | 28 November 2019 | 4 November 2021 |
| Ukraine | Ukrainian, Russian | 1 February 2020 | 4 November 2021 |
| Finland | Finnish, Swedish | 5 December 2019 | 4 November 2021 |

== Countries and territories without lockdowns ==
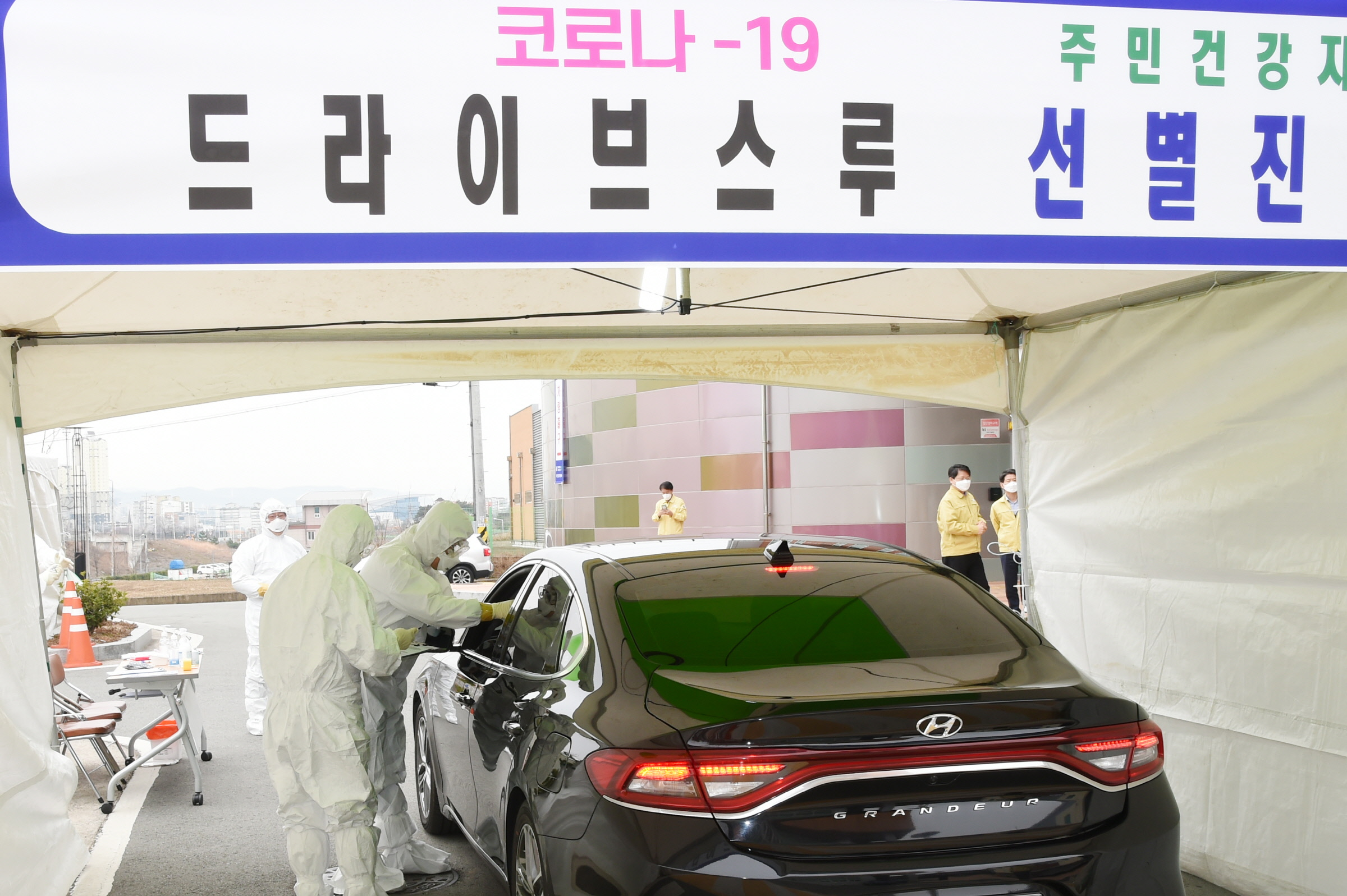
A drive through COVID-19 testing site in South Korea in February 2020. South Korea's K-Quarantine strategy included rapidly developing mass testing capacity and infrastructure.

Most countries and territories affected with COVID-19 introduced and enforced some form of lockdown. However, only a few exceptions included Japan, South Korea and Taiwan, which rapidly and consistently implemented highly organized mass testing, contact tracing, public messaging and selective quarantining to identify and isolate outbreaks. South Korea's K-Quarantine system was praised in international media for its effectiveness. Authorities in Tokyo, the capital of Japan, advised businesses to close and the population to stay at home, but did not have legal authority to enforce a lockdown or penalise non-compliance. Compliance with advice was nevertheless high.

In the European Union, the only nation not following this strategy is Sweden. Led by its state epidemiologist Anders Tegnell measures in Sweden included the closing of universities and high schools and asking older and at-risk residents to avoid social contact, while keeping restaurants, primary schools and kindergartens open and not mandating face masks. However, in early 2021, new laws permitting lockdown were enacted and Prime Minister Stefan Löfven warned that a lockdown was being considered. As of November 2021, a national lockdown had not been announced. However certain regions of Sweden have declared their own lockdowns to help slow the rate of infection. The region of Uppsala reported 908 cases per 100,000 people over a two-weeks time compared to a national average of 772 in early April ‘21. This caused the Health Chief of the region, Mikael Köhler, to ask individuals within the region to "act as if they were in a personal lockdown."

Some of the countries that did not enact lockdowns during ‘20, did so later in the pandemic. In Malawi, a proposed lockdown by the government was delayed by the High Court throughout 2020, until a state of emergency was declared and the country entered a lockdown in January 2021 in response to a worsening outbreak. Although Cambodia restricted movement within the country during a period in 2020, it introduced its first major restrictions, including a curfew and later a stay-at-home order in the capital Phnom Penh, during its largest outbreak to date in early 2021. East Timor also enacted its first lockdown of its capital Dili in March 2021 and Turkey entered its first nationwide lockdown in April 2021.

Two states in Brazil and several others in the United States did not introduce any lockdown-type measures (commonly known as "stay-at-home orders").

Countries and territories without lockdowns
| Countries and territories | | Ref |
|---|---|---|
| Belarus | | |
| Brazil | Roraima | |
| Brazil | Rondônia | |
| Burundi | | |
| Iceland | | |
| Japan | | |
| Nicaragua | | |
| South Korea | | |
| Sweden | | |
| Taiwan | | |
| Tanzania | | |
| United States | Arkansas | |
| United States | Iowa | |
| United States | Nebraska | |
| United States | North Dakota | |
| United States | South Dakota | |
| United States | Wyoming | |
| Uruguay | | |
