= Iryna Danylovych =

Ukrainian political prisoner (born 1979)

- Ірина Данилович
- Born: 6 May 1979 (age 47); Kazyany, Byelorussian SSR, Soviet Union
- Citizenship: Ukraine
- Occupations: Nurse; Journalist
- Criminal charges: Illegal acquisition, transfer, sale, storage, transportation or carrying of explosives or explosive devices
- Criminal penalty: Seven years' imprisonment
- Criminal status: Convicted

Iryna Bronislavivna Danylovych (Ukrainian: Ірина Броніславівна Данилович; born 6 May 1979) is a Ukrainian nurse, citizen journalist and political prisoner. Born in Belarus and raised in Crimea, Danylovych worked in the health as a nurse and later a trade unionist, while also writing articles on healthcare for local news outlets. A critic of the Russian invasions of Crimea in 2014 and the rest of Ukraine in 2022, Danylovych was sentenced to seven years' imprisonment in December 2022 in a trial considered by human rights organisations to be politically motivated.

== Personal life ==
Danylovych was born on 6 May 1979 in Kazyany, a village in the Vitebsk region of what was then the Byelorussian Soviet Socialist Republic, a constituent republic of the Soviet Union. In 1983, her family moved to Crimea in the Ukrainian SSR, where Danylovych later trained as a nurse.

Danylovych worked as a nurse at a medical centre in the village of Vladyslavivka in the Feodosia Raion of Crimea; she also served as head of the Crimean branch of Alyans Likariv, a Ukrainian medical trade union. Danylovych worked as a citizen journalist, often reporting on the Crimean and Ukrainian healthcare systems for outlets such as INzhir, Krymskiy protses, and Krym.Realii, a Crimean project of Radio Svoboda, the Ukrainian-language service of Radio Free Europe/Radio Liberty. During the COVID-19 pandemic in Crimea, Danylovych became known for writing public articles on her Facebook page about the impact it was having on the Russian-controlled healthcare system in Crimea. She also condemned the Russian invasion of Ukraine in February 2022.

== Arrest and imprisonment ==
=== Pre-trial detention and sentencing (2022) ===
On 29 April 2022, Danylovych was abducted from a bus stop in Koktebel while travelling home from work. Later that day, Russian police officers searched her home, seizing equipment and books, and informed her family that she had been placed under "administrative arrest". Danylovych's location remained unknown until 11 May, when her lawyer located her at a detention centre in Simferopol. Her arrest was condemned by the National Union of Journalists of Ukraine, who ordered for her location to be disclosed and for her to be unconditionally released.

On 7 May, Danylovych was placed in pre-trial detention for almost two months as a "preventative measure" on suspicion of the "illegal acquisition, transfer, sale, storage, transportation or carrying of explosives or explosive devices" under article 222.1 of the Russian criminal code. The following month, the Russian government added Danylovych to its list of foreign agents.

In July 2022, a judge sitting within the Kyiv District Court of the City of Simferopol extended Danylovych's detention pending her trial. On 28 December 2022, the Feodosia City Court of Crimea sentenced her to seven years in prison, in addition to a fine of 50, 000 RUB.

=== Post-sentencing (2023–present) ===
Following Danylovych's sentencing, the Ministry of Foreign Affairs of Ukraine issued a statement condemning the Russian-controlled Crimean authorities' detention and sentencing of Danylovych, describing it as illegal. The Platform for the Protection of Journalism and Safety of Journalists also expressed its concern about Danylovych's conviction.

On 21 March 2023, Danylovych went on hunger strike in protest of her sentence, as well as due to prison authorities failing to provide her with adequate healthcare. An appeal led to her sentence being reduced by one month, to six years and 11 months of imprisonment.

On 21 June 2023, Dmytro Lubinets, the Commissioner for Human Rights of the Verkhovna Rada, published a report stating that Danylovych was at risk of torture and losing her hearing as a result of mistreatment in prison. He appealed to the United Nations High Commissioner for Human Rights, Volker Türk; the Secretary-General of the United Nations, António Guterres; and the International Committee of the Red Cross, to intervene in Danylovych's case.

The following month, Danylovych was transferred from Crimea to a prison in Krasnodar in Russia, which was described as illegal and a contravention of the Geneva Conventions. In October 2023, it was reported that Danylovych had lost her hearing in her right ear.

By July 2025, Danylovych had been moved again, to women's colony no. 7 in Zelenokumsk. That same month, she wrote a letter to Pina Picierno, the Vice-President of the European Parliament, describing her experiences of psychological torture while in prison. In response, Picierno expressed her "deep concern" about Danylovych's welfare.

In 2026, the European Court of Human Rights began considering two complaints against Russia concerning Danylovych's arrest, trial, and detention. The human rights organisations Reporters Without Borders and the American Human Rights Foundation concurrently referred Danylovych's case to six United Nations special rapporteurs for further consideration.

== Recognition ==
In 2025, Danylovych received the Platform of European Memory and Conscience Prize in recognition of her "civic courage [and] independent journalism" in reporting on human rights abuses in occupied Crimea. That same year, she received the Stories of Injustice award from the Czech human rights organisation People in Need. The award was received on Danylovych's behalf by Tetiana Pechonchyk, the chairwoman of the ZMINA Human Rights Centre, who delivered a speech at the ceremony in Prague.
