= COVID-19 pandemic in Crimea =

Ongoing COVID-19 viral pandemic in Crimea

- Disease: COVID-19
- Pathogen: SARS-CoV-2
- Location: Crimea
- First outbreak: Wuhan, Hubei, China
- Arrival date: 21 March 2020 (6 years, 6 months and 3 weeks)
- Confirmed cases: 217,695
- Recovered: 210,528
- Deaths: 5,431

Government website
- rk.gov.ru/koronavirus

The first confirmed case of COVID-19 in the peninsula of Crimea was confirmed on 21 March 2020. (Note: The political status of Crimea is disputed. Crimea is internationally recognised as part of Ukraine, and is de jure considered part of the Autonomous Republic of Crimea. However, Crimea has been under de facto Russian control since the 2014 Russian annexation of Crimea, and Russia administers the territory as the Republic of Crimea.) By the autumn of 2021 in November, Crimea had recorded an official count of 97,496 confirmed cases and 3,010 deaths. After a significant increase in numbers by 3 August 2023, there were a reported 217,695 confirmed cases and 5,431 deaths. The Russian government, which has administered the peninsula since 2014, includes cases in the Republic of Crimea in its count of cases in Russia, while Ukraine, which considers the peninsula a temporarily occupied territory, monitors the situation through the Ministry of Temporarily Occupied Territories.

Prior to the first case being identified, in response to the wider outbreak in Russia, on 17 March 2020, the region was put on high alert and mass events were banned. Additional restrictions were put in place on 1 May 2020, which included mandatory observation for COVID-19 of people entering the peninsula, although it was noted that this was not as evenly applied to people who entered via the Kerch Bridge. The self-isolation edict was lifted on 18 May 2020, although by October 2021, with a significant increase in cases, heavy restrictions were put back in place by the authorities.

== Background ==
On 12 January 2020, the World Health Organization (WHO) confirmed that a novel coronavirus was the cause of a respiratory illness in a cluster of people in Wuhan City, Hubei Province, China, which was reported to the WHO on 31 December 2019.

The case fatality ratio for COVID-19 has been much lower than SARS of 2003, but the transmission has been significantly greater, with a significant total death toll.

== Timeline ==
=== March 2020 ===
Starting on 16 March, prior to the first case being confirmed in the peninsula, the authorities of Crimea began making official decisions regarding the pandemic in response to the wider spread in Russia. The Russian authorities had already adopted regulatory acts regarding the pandemic and measures to prevent the spread starting on 24 January, which was approved by Rospotrebnadzor on 10 March. On 17 March, Sergey Aksyonov, the de facto Head of the Republic of Crimea, officially signed an edict that put the region on high alert, which was the first official restriction in Crimea. The edict banned mass events, and the Ministry of Internal Affairs of Crimea was instructed to locate people who had arrived from territories that were already affected by COVID-19. On 21 March, the first case was confirmed. As of 30 March 2020, there were five confirmed cases in Sevastopol. There were 20 confirmed cases in total by this date.

A later report by the Crimean Human Rights Group found that during the initial period of infection in March 2020, despite official restrictions that were more strictly implemented starting on 25 March by edict, public events continued to be held. A commemoration event was widely attended in Feodosiya on 18 March, a grand opening in Dzhankoy on 20 March, and fairs were attended in Simferopol and Yalta on 28 March. The same report also found that many people initially with symptoms were sent to self-isolation without proper testing and that patients prior to 17 March with pneumonia were not tested for the disease, which could've prevented the spread.

=== April-May 2020 ===
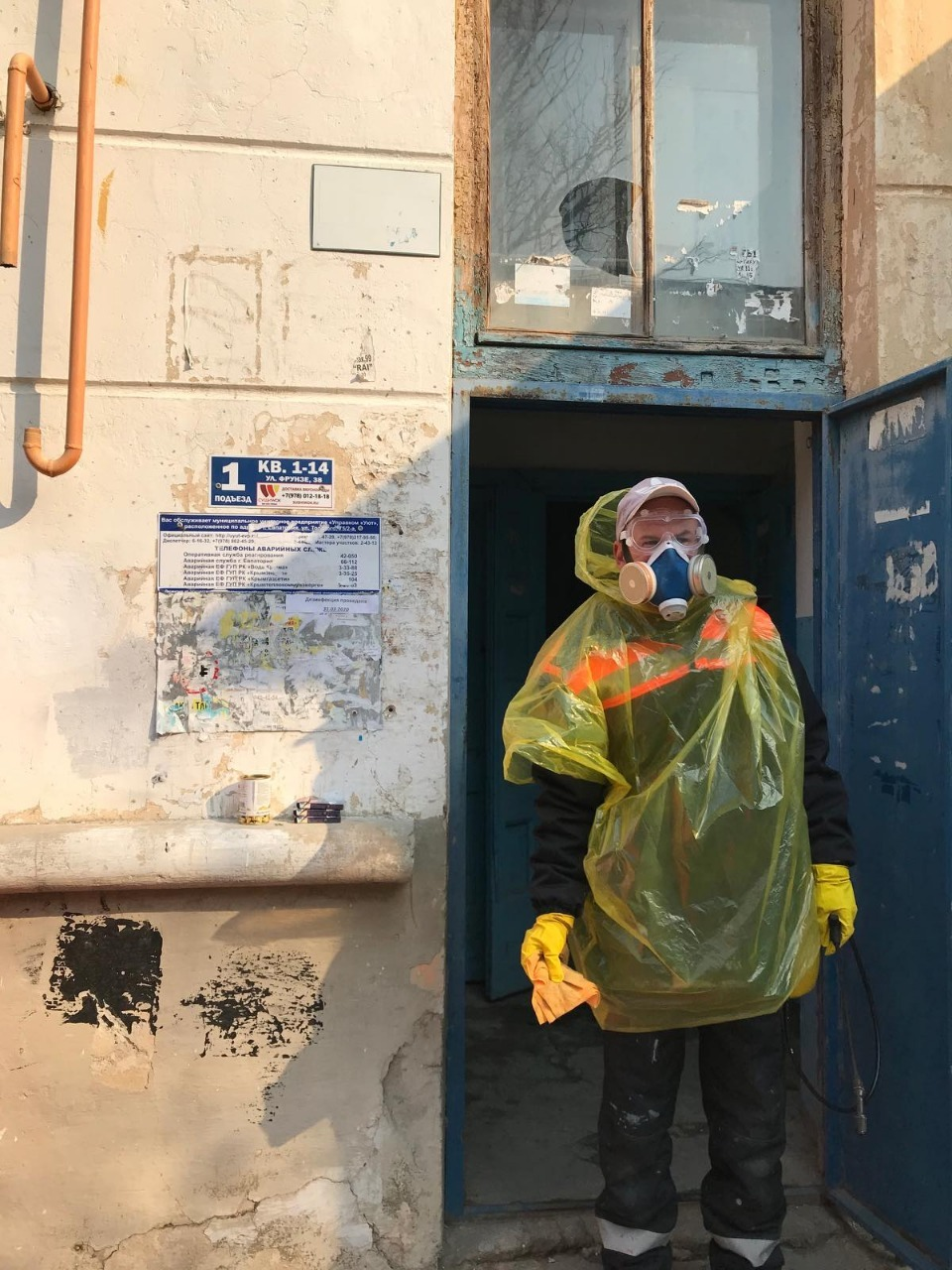
A disinfection worker in Yevpatoria in April 2020.

By 23 April, there were a total of nearly 80 cases of the infection according to the Ministry of Temporarily Occupied Territories. Of those cases, 53 were directly acknowledged by the Russian authorities, with the Ukrainian ministry stating the 80 cases came from the fact that military personnel cases were not being added to the official number. There was also confirmed to be a widespread outbreak in Yalta due to a married couple returning and subsequently helping the volunteer efforts while having COVID-19. Starting on 1 May, additional restrictions were put in place that all persons without a residence permit in Crimea and the presence of property when arriving in Crimea would be placed in an observatory for 14 days. Residents who met the criteria, in comparison, would, starting from that date, also be required to spend 14 days in isolation but only at their residence when re-entering Crimea. An ISPI commentary also noted that from May 2020, air traffic had significantly fallen alongside rail traffic, but at the same time, there was a peak in arrivals via the Kerch Bridge which led to some concern by local residents about consistent quarantine measures.

As of May 11, Aksionov reported 126 COVID-19 cases in the city of Sevastopol and 202 cases in the rest of the peninsula, for 328 cases in total. The self-isolation edict was lifted on 18 May, and was instead replaced with a recommendation to only avoid unnecessary travel. However, residents over the age of 65 in Crimea were still required to stay at home, and the requirements for the use of masks and minors being prohibited from public places without parental supervision were not lifted with the self-isolation one. Compared to other Russian federal subjects, Crimea appeared to be one of the least affected regions to date by May, in comparison to Kaluga Oblast (which has half the population), having over 2,600 cases by this date.

=== July 2020 ===
According to the Crimean Human Rights Group, on 10 July 2020 there were ten new cases in Crimea including Sevastopol. The total count by this date was 1,089 with 37 deaths.

=== August 2020 ===
On 28 August, it was reported there was a record single-day increase of 84 new cases, the highest figure in Crimea since the start of the pandemic in March. Of those, 52 were due to contact with people who had the infection, 20 were from people seeking medical help, 11 were from screenings, and 1 case came from Uzbekistan. At the end of August, it was reported that there was a total of 2,271 confirmed cases in Crimea, of which 473 were in Sevastopol. Radio Svoboda, however, at the time said that the statistic was like signficantly underestimated due to underreporting of cases within the military.

=== October-November 2021 ===
At the beginning of November 2021, it was reported that the number of cases of the infection was spreading sharply, at least since mid-September. Since 16 September, there has been a continuous increase in cases for 47 days in a row, and on 3 October 2021, it was reported that there was a historical maximum of 421 cases in one day. Just a few weeks later, on 1 November 2021, the historical maximum increased to 725 cases in one day. The confirmed cases reached 97,496, with 3,010 people having died. The record number of deaths in Crimea from COVID-19 in a single day was also set during this time, on 29 October, with 18 deaths in a day.

In response to this, the authorities heavily tightened restrictions in late October 2021. Under these restrictions, entertainment centers were banned from operating on weekends, restaurants and cafes were prohibited from operating at certain times, and residents over the age of 60 were again required to self-isolate, with the exception being those who had a demonstrated vaccine or who had previously had the infection. Entry into hotels, sanatoriums, and buildings that had an area of more than 300 square meters also now had the requirement of presenting a QR code confirming vaccination or a previous infection. However, Aksionov also confirmed that a complete lockdown of Crimea was not planned, only heavy restrictions.

== Medical response ==
In a 2021 article by Wiadomości Lekarskie, the journal of the Polish Medical Association, it was noted that there were structural factors that had increased the impact of COVID-19 in Crimea specifically. In the paper, the authors said that the reorganisation of Crimea's healthcare system after 2014, which replaced the model with a Russian insurance medicine model, had greatly reduced medical personnel and left hospital infrastructure in conditions not up to date by the time of the start of the pandemic. Also, people who had not obtained Russian citizenship by the start of the pandemic, such as the minority who had retained their Ukrainian citizenship, had difficulties accessing state medical services. Other factors identified that led to an increase by 2021 included restrictions on WHO-recognised COVID-19 vaccines outside of Russian-produced ones, such as Sputnik V, during a time of limited medical supply and the restriction of European-certified medications, with both having limited available treatment options.

Another paper by the Bulletin of Physiotherapy and Balneology from the Crimean Federal University also found that, specific to Crimea, anti-epidemic measures needed to be implemented that prevented prolonged close contact in shared spaces, which was common with sanatorium tourism in the region, given evidence that COVID-19 spread more readily through contact than brief airborne exposure.

In 2022, Iryna Danylovych, a nurse based in Crimea, wrote articles about the impact of COVID-19 on the Crimean healthcare system. She was subsequently arrested and sentenced to seven years' imprisonment on explosives charges widely considered to be politically motivated in nature.

== See also ==
- COVID-19 pandemic in Russia
- COVID-19 pandemic in Ukraine
