= Irish government response to the COVID-19 pandemic =

In response to the COVID-19 pandemic in the Republic of Ireland, the Irish government introduced various public health and economic measures to mitigate its impact.

The virus reached the country in late February 2020 and cases soon confirmed in all counties. The government shut schools, childcare facilities and cultural institutions on 12 March 2020. Taoiseach Leo Varadkar announced the first stay-at-home order on 27 March, which banned all non-essential travel and contact with others.

Infections and deaths dropped to low levels by summer 2020 and restrictions were gradually lifted. Across the country, social distancing measures, self-isolation laws for those exposed to the virus and rules on face masks were introduced, as well as efforts to expand COVID-19 testing and tracing. In autumn and winter 2020, nationwide lockdowns were introduced in response to a surge in COVID-19 cases and the Alpha variant. A COVID-19 vaccination programme began in December 2020. In mid-2021, the government lifted restrictions during the fourth wave driven by the Delta variant, until further restrictions were reintroduced in response to the Omicron variant in December that year. Remaining restrictions were lifted from 28 February 2022 under a Living with COVID-19 plan announced by the government in early 2022.

== Initial response (February–March 2020) ==
The National Public Health Emergency Team (NPHET), a group within the Department of Health, began monitoring the spread of the virus before it was confirmed to have reached Ireland.

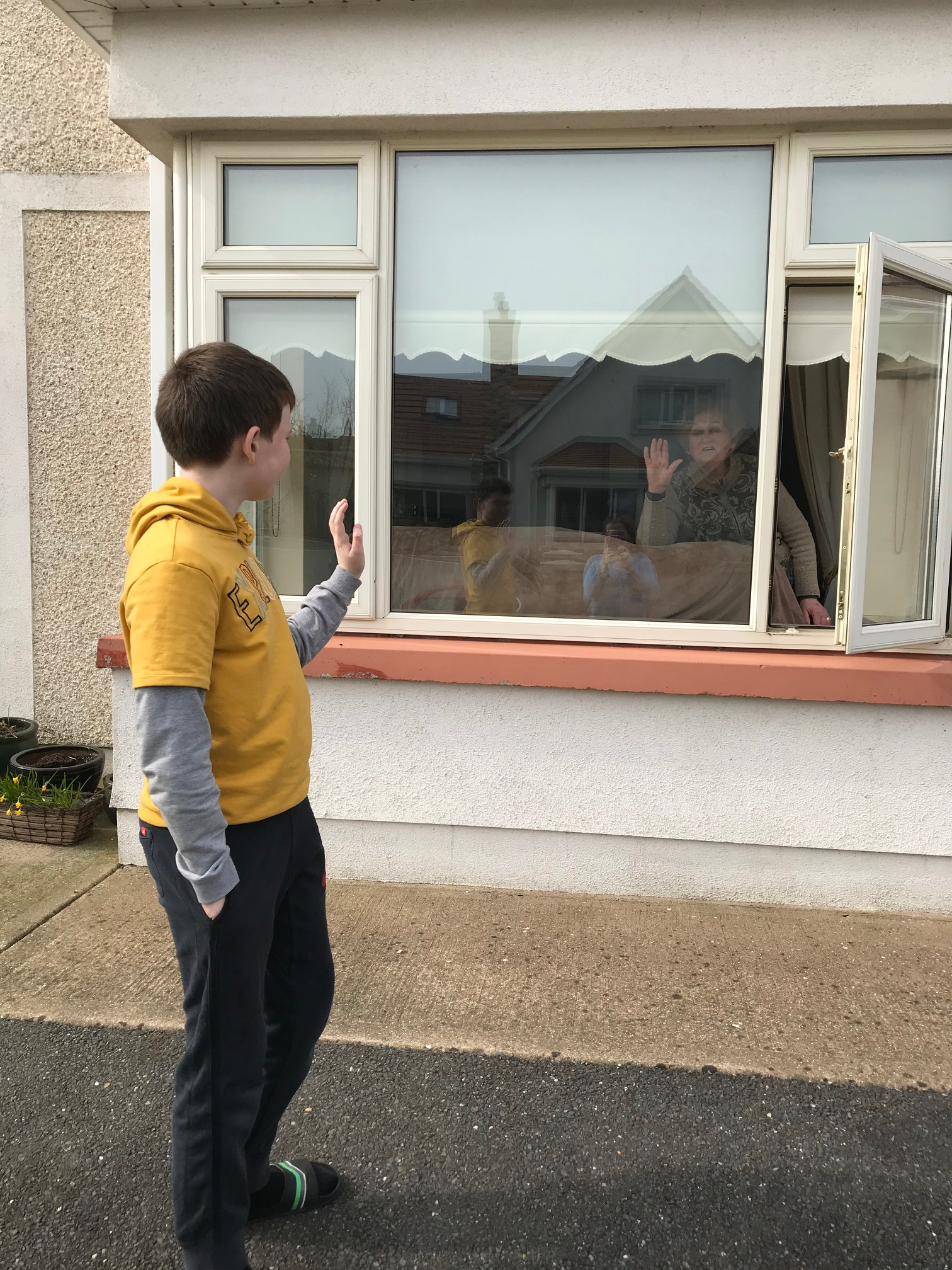
A grandson visits his grandmother who is "cocooning" in her home.

On 12 March 2020, Taoiseach Leo Varadkar announced from Washington, D.C.—where he was meeting U.S. President Donald Trump—measures intended to stop COVID-19 spreading, including the closure of all schools, universities and childcare facilities from the following day, as well as the closure of all cultural institutions and the cancellation of "all indoor mass gatherings of more than 100 people and outdoor mass gatherings of more than 500 people". After returning home earlier than anticipated from his visit to the United States, Taoiseach Varadkar addressed the nation on Saint Patrick's Night during A Ministerial Broadcast by An Taoiseach Leo Varadkar, TD, introducing television viewers to the concept of "cocooning". The speech, which Varadkar made under Section 112 of the Broadcast Act, was the most watched television event in Irish history, surpassing the previous record held by The Late Late Toy Show by an additional total of about 25% and was widely distributed globally. It was also plagiarised by Peter Bellew, the chief operating officer at British low-cost airline group EasyJet.

On 15 March, the Government ordered bars and public houses to close and advised against house parties.

On 24 March, Taoiseach Leo Varadkar announced from Government Buildings the extension of all existing measures until 19 April—as well as stricter measures, among which were: the limiting of social gatherings to four people (unless members of the same household); the shutting of all non-essential retail outlets still open—effective from midnight—bringing an official end to hairdressing, theatres, gyms, leisure centres, betting offices, marts and other market places, casinos and bingo halls, playgrounds, holiday caravan parks, organised indoor and outdoor social events of any kind, including all sport (some of which, such as horse racing, was then still being held behind closed doors); the limitation of cafes and restaurants to takeaway and delivery services. Varadkar stopped short of calling it a "lockdown", the term used in other countries.

== First national lockdown (March–May 2020) ==
On the evening of Friday 27 March, Taoiseach Leo Varadkar gave a live televised speech to the nation during which he announced further restrictions on public activity and Ireland's first stay-at-home order. He said that all people must stay at home until 12 April (Easter Sunday) from the following midnight with the following exemptions: to travel to and from work (essential work only); shopping for food or household goods; to attend medical appointments or collect medicines or related products; for vital family reasons, such as caring for a relative; to take brief exercise within 2 km of home; for farming purposes, such as food production or care of animals. Department of the Taoiseach official Liz Canavan later clarified that the movement restrictions also did not apply to anyone trying to avoid "risk of harm", including those attempting to evade domestic abuse. All public or private gatherings of any number of people outside a residence were prohibited. More non-essential shops and services were shut, adult community education centres and local community centres were shut. All non-essential surgery, health procedures and other non-essential health services was postponed. All visits to hospitals, other residential healthcare facilities and prisons would cease, with specific exemptions on compassionate grounds. Shielding, or cocooning, of those over 70 years of age, or those regarded as being in specific categories of vulnerable people, was introduced. Minister for Transport Shane Ross confirmed that, following Varadkar's announcement of 28 March, driving tests and NCTs would be suspended, stating that it was "critical that we give drivers as well as operators of commercial vehicles peace of mind in relation to the status of their licence, learner permit, NCT certificate or certificate of roadworthiness, especially if it has expired or is likely to expire during the period of the COVID-19 health crisis". On 6 June, Minister for Transport Shane Ross announced that NCT and DTT service centres would reopen from 8 June.

On 10 April (Good Friday), Varadkar announced that the measures introduced on 27 March would be extended until at least 5 May.

On 1 May, Taoiseach Leo Varadkar announced the extension of the current restrictions to 18 May at the earliest.

== Lifting the first lockdown and regional restrictions (May–September 2020) ==
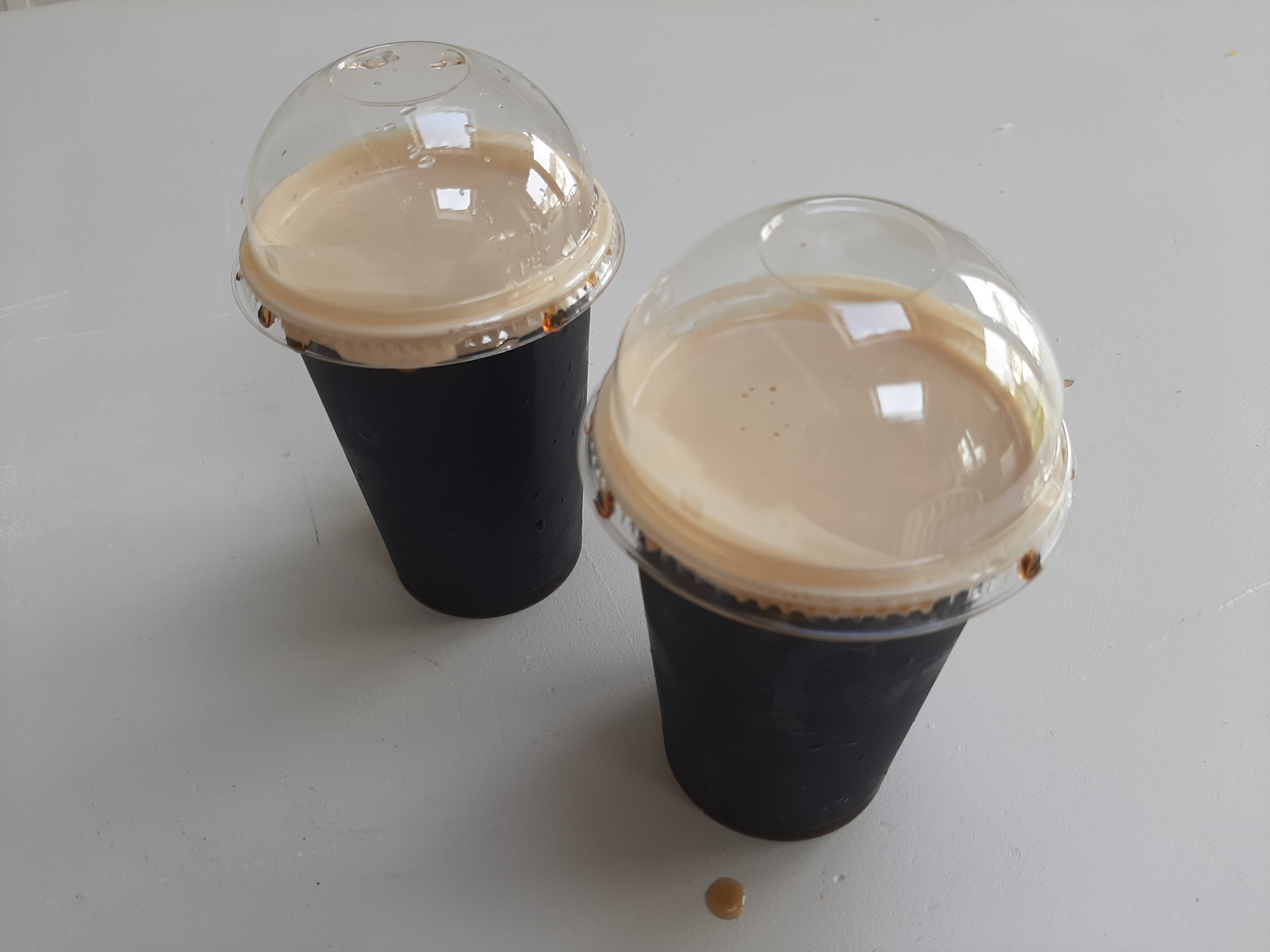
Two pints of stout delivered fresh from a pub. The delivery service of pints was a novel innovation of the pandemic in Ireland. The Garda Síochána—upon taking legal advice—confirmed that there was no law against the service.

On 1 May 2020, Taoiseach Leo Varadkar announced a roadmap to easing restrictions in Ireland that included five stages and was adopted by the government.

On 5 June, Varadkar announced a series of changes to the government's roadmap of easing COVID-19 restrictions in Ireland, which he summed up as: "Stay Local".

On 12 June, Varadkar announced that travel restrictions remain in place and that nobody should leave Ireland for the purpose of tourism or leisure.

On 19 June, Varadkar announced a further re-configuration of the government's roadmap of easing COVID-19 restrictions with hairdressers, barbers, gyms, cinemas and churches reopening from 29 June.

On 7 August, the new Taoiseach Micheál Martin announced a series of regional measures for counties Kildare, Laois and Offaly following significant increases of COVID-19 cases in the three counties, which would come into effect from midnight and remain in place for two weeks. Measures include:

- Residents of the three counties prohibited to travel outside of their counties except for in limited circumstances including to travel to and from work.
- Restaurants, cafés, pubs serving food, cinemas, gyms, theatres, museums, galleries, bingo halls, casinos, betting shops, leisure centres and other indoor recreational and cultural outlets to close.
- All retail outlets may remain open but with strict adherence to public health guidelines, including the wearing of face coverings.
- All indoor gatherings restricted to 6 people and outdoor gatherings restricted to 15 people.

On 18 August, following a Cabinet meeting at Government Buildings, the Government announced six new nationwide measures because of the growing number of confirmed cases, which would remain in place until at least 13 September:

- All outdoor events limited to 15 people
- All indoor events limited to 6 people, except for religious services, weddings and businesses, such as shops and restaurants
- Gardaí to be given new powers to enforce rules around social gatherings in restaurants and bars serving food, and in private homes
- Restaurants and cafés remain open with closing times of 11.30 pm
- People to be advised to work from home and to avoid using public transport, unless absolutely necessary
- Sports events and matches revert to behind closed doors with strict avoidance of social gatherings before and after events

On 9 September, the Government announced that measures introduced on 18 August would be extended until Tuesday 15 September as a new roadmap for "living with COVID-19" would be announced, which would include a colour-coded, five-level system to indicate what public health measures would be in place in different areas of the country at any given time.

On 15 September, the Government announced a medium-term plan for living with COVID-19 that included five levels of restrictions, with the entire country at Level 2 and specific restrictions in Dublin including the postponement of the reopening of pubs not serving food.

| Level | Social & Family Gatherings | Weddings | Indoor & Outdoor Events | Sports Training, Matches & Events | Gyms, Pools & Leisure Centres | Religious Services | Restaurants, Cafés & Pubs | Hotels, Guesthouses & B&Bs | Retail & Services | Indoor Cultural Venues | Domestic Travel | Public Transport | Schools & Childcare |
|---|---|---|---|---|---|---|---|---|---|---|---|---|---|
| 1 | Maximum 10 from 3 other households | Maximum 100 people can attend | Indoor: 100/200 depending on venue size; Outdoor: 200/500 depending on venue size | Normal training with protective measures; Matches & Events: 100 indoors/200 outdoor/500 stadia | Open with protective measures | 50 people can attend | Open with protective measures | Open with protective measures | Open with protective measures | Open with protective measures | No restrictions | Off-peak hours | Open with protective measures |
| 2 | Maximum 6 from 3 other households | Maximum 50 people can attend | Indoor: 50/100 depending on venue size; Outdoor: 100/200 depending on venue size | Indoor training: pods of 6; Outdoor training: pods of 15; Matches & Events: 50 indoors/100 outdoors/200 stadia | Open with protective measures | 50 people can attend | Groups of 6 from up to 3 households | Open with protective measures | Open with protective measures | Open with protective measures | No restrictions | 50% capacity / peak-hours prioritised | Open with protective measures |
| 3 | Maximum 6 from 1 other household | Maximum 25 people can attend | No organised indoor events; Outdoor: gatherings of up to 15 | Indoor training: 1 individual only; Outdoor training: pods of 15 (non-contact); Matches & Events: except specific exemptions | Individual training only | Services move online; 25 people can attend funerals | Range of restrictions up to and including no indoor dining | Services limited to residents only | Open with protective measures | Venues closed | Stay in your county | 50% capacity, use only when necessary | Open with protective measures |
| 4 | No visitors | Maximum 6 people can attend | No organised indoor events; Outdoor: gatherings of up to 15 | Indoor training: 1 individual only; Outdoor training: pods of 15 (non-contact); Matches & Events: except specific exemptions | Closed | Services move online; 25 people can attend funerals | Outdoor dining (maximum 15 people), takeaway or delivery | Existing guests & essential purposes only | Primarily outdoor essential retail/services | Venues closed | Stay in your county | 25% capacity, avoid public transport | Open with protective measures |
| 5 | No visitors | Maximum 6 people can attend | No organised indoor/outdoor events | Individual training only & no events | Closed | Services move online; 10 people can attend funerals | Takeaway or delivery only | Essential purposes only | Essential retail only | Venues closed | Stay at home, exercise within 5 km | 25% capacity, avoid public transport | Recommendations based on situation & evidence at time |

On 18 September, following an announcement at Government Buildings, Taoiseach Micheál Martin confirmed that Dublin would move to Level 3 restrictions from midnight and would remain in place for three weeks until 9 October.

On 24 September, Taoiseach Micheál Martin confirmed that Donegal would also move to Level 3 restrictions from the midnight of 25 September and would remain in place for three weeks until 16 October, with pubs remaining open for takeaway, delivery and outdoor dining to a maximum of 15 people only.

== Second national lockdown (October–December 2020) ==
On 4 October, in a letter sent to the Government, the National Public Health Emergency Team (NPHET) recommended the highest level of restrictions for the entire country – Level 5 for four weeks, following an unscheduled NPHET meeting chaired by Chief Medical Officer Tony Holohan. The next day on 5 October, the Government rejected NPHET's recommendation, and instead moved every county in Ireland to Level 3 restrictions with improved enforcement and indoor dining in pubs and restaurants banned, which would come into effect from the midnight of 6 October until 27 October at the earliest. Speaking on RTÉ's Claire Byrne Live, Tánaiste Leo Varadkar stated that the recommendation from NPHET to move to Level 5 "hadn't been thought through and there hadn't been prior consultation".

On 14 October, the Government agreed a nationwide ban on all household visits from the night of Thursday 15 October, except for essential reasons such as childcare and on compassionate grounds. Taoiseach Micheál Martin announced that counties Cavan, Donegal and Monaghan would move to Level 4 restrictions from the midnight of 15 October until 10 November.

On 16 October, the NPHET recommended to the Government to move the entire country to Level 5 restrictions for six weeks. The next day, Chief Medical Officer Tony Holohan, Deputy Chief Medical Officer Ronan Glynn and Chair of the Epidemiological Modelling Advisory Group Philip Nolan briefed the Government to explain why the NPHET recommended moving the entire country to Level 5 for six weeks.

On 19 October, the Government agreed to move the entire country to Level 5 lockdown restrictions from midnight on Wednesday 21 October for six weeks until 1 December.

On 8 November, the Government was criticised for a lack of clarity on what COVID-19 restrictions would apply at Christmas after the Chair of the Irish Epidemiological Modelling Advisory Group Philip Nolan warned that strict limits would be needed on Christmas gatherings.

On 24 November, Tánaiste Leo Varadkar stated in Dáil Éireann that a third wave of restrictions may be required in the new year after the Christmas holiday.

On 27 November, the Government agreed the approach for easing restrictions, including a phased move to Level 3 restrictions nationally from midnight on Tuesday 1 December, with a number of exceptions in place for the Christmas period from 18 December.

Following the announcement of a third wave of COVID-19 that had arrived in the country, the Government acted swiftly and on 22 December, Level 5 lockdown restrictions (subject to a number of adjustments) were agreed by the Government, which came into effect from 24 December (Christmas Eve) until 12 January 2021 at the earliest.

== Third national lockdown (January–June 2021) ==
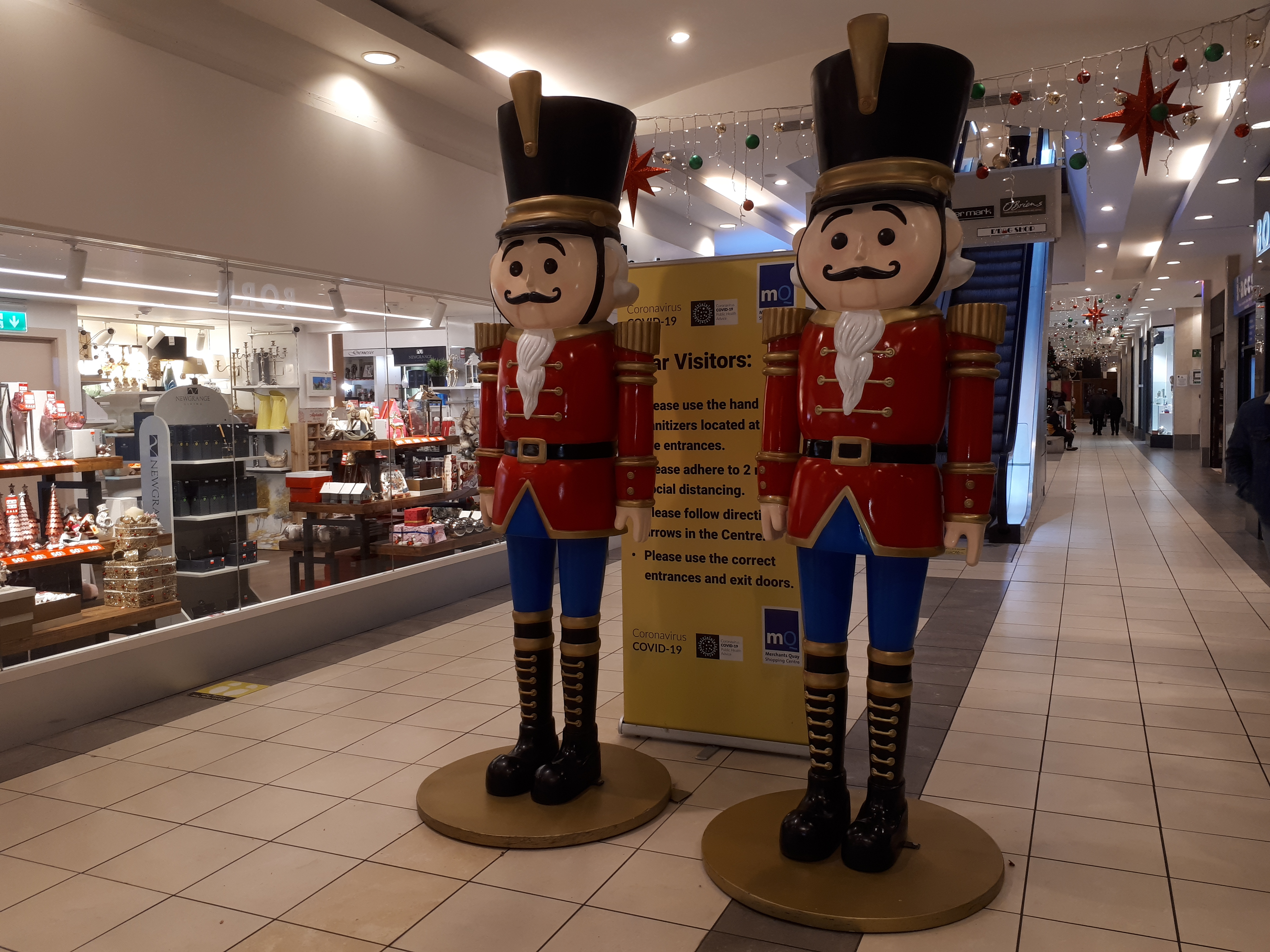
Mall sign on New Year's Eve, 31 December 2021, indicating the need for continued hand hygiene, social distancing and making use of one flow system.

On 30 December, six days after lockdown restrictions with a number of adjustments were reimposed nationwide, the Government agreed to move the entire country to full Level 5 lockdown restrictions from midnight until 31 January 2021 at the earliest.

On 6 January 2021, the Government agreed a number of new lockdown measures including the closure of all schools until February with Leaving Certificate students allowed to attend school for three days a week, the closure of all non-essential construction sites with certain exceptions at 6 pm on 8 January, the requirement from 9 January for all passengers from the UK and South Africa to have a negative PCR test that they acquired within 72 hours of travelling and the prohibition of click-and-collect services for non-essential retail. During the new lockdown, the Government was forced to abandon plans for Leaving Certificate students to attend school on three days a week and plans to reopen special schools on Thursday 21 January for thousands of children with special educational needs due to safety concerns among staff unions.

On 22 January, Taoiseach Micheál Martin confirmed that there would be no easing of Level 5 lockdown restrictions at the end of January and suggested the current restrictions would be in place for at least another four weeks. On 26 January, the Government announced the extension of the Level 5 lockdown restrictions until 5 March, along with a number of new measures including a mandatory 14-day quarantine period for all people travelling into the country without a negative COVID-19 test, including all arrivals from Brazil and South Africa.

On 23 February, Taoiseach Micheál Martin announced the extension of Level 5 lockdown restrictions for another six weeks until 5 April (Easter Monday) at the earliest as the Government published its new revised Living with COVID-19 plan called "The Path Ahead", which included the phased reopening of schools and childcare and the extension of the COVID-19 Pandemic Unemployment Payment and the Employment Wage Subsidy Scheme.

On 30 March, the Government announced a phased easing of Level 5 restrictions from Monday 12 April, with people allowed to travel within their county, two households allowed to meet socially outdoors, people who are fully vaccinated against COVID-19 allowed to meet other fully vaccinated people indoors, and the resumption of all residential construction projects from that date.

On 29 April, the Government announced a reopening plan for the country throughout May and June from 10 May, with inter-county travel allowed, the reopening of all hairdressers, libraries, museums and galleries, up to 50 people allowed to attend religious services, the resumption of click-and-collect services and the allowances of three households to meet outdoors (including in private gardens) and a vaccinated household to meet an unvaccinated household indoors from that date.

On 28 May, the Government announced a further reopening plan for the country throughout June, July and August, with the reopening of all hotels from 2 June, outdoor hospitality, cinemas, swimming pools, gyms from 7 June, and indoor hospitality from 5 July.

On 29 June, due to the rapidly increasing incidence of the Delta variant, the Government announced that the planned reopening of indoor dining and drinking in restaurants and pubs on 5 July would be delayed until at least 19 July when a system to verify vaccination or immunity would be implemented, while 50 guests would be permitted to attend wedding celebrations as an exception from July. Following several meetings and discussions between the hospitality sector and senior government officials to discuss a new self-regulated vaccine pass system, indoor dining and drinking in restaurants and pubs resumed on Monday 26 July to fully vaccinated or COVID-19 recovered people, with businesses operating under new strict guidelines. Under the new guidelines, there would be no time limits for customers, closing time would be set at 11:30 pm, up to six adults would be allowed sit at tables, the EU Digital COVID Certificate (DCC) would be the primary evidence for proof of immunity, all customers would have to show photo ID, with an online QR code scanner developed to verify people's DCCs.

== Further developments (August–December 2021) ==
On 6 August, following a meeting of the Cabinet COVID-19 sub-committee, it was announced that the Government would publish a roadmap by the end of August for the easing or ending of remaining COVID-19 restrictions. On 31 August, the Government announced a further reopening plan for the country, with all remaining COVID-19 restrictions to be eased by 22 October, including the two-metre social distancing rule depending on the requirement of individual sectors, while masks would still be required in the health and retail sectors and on public transport.

After a sudden rise in COVID-19 figures, on 19 October, the Government published a revised plan for the easing of restrictions on 22 October, with nightclubs allowed to reopen, the return of normal trading hours in pubs and restaurants, no attendance limits on weddings and religious ceremonies and 100% capacity allowed at sporting venues, while the continued use of masks, vaccine certificates and social distancing measures would remain in place until at least February 2022.

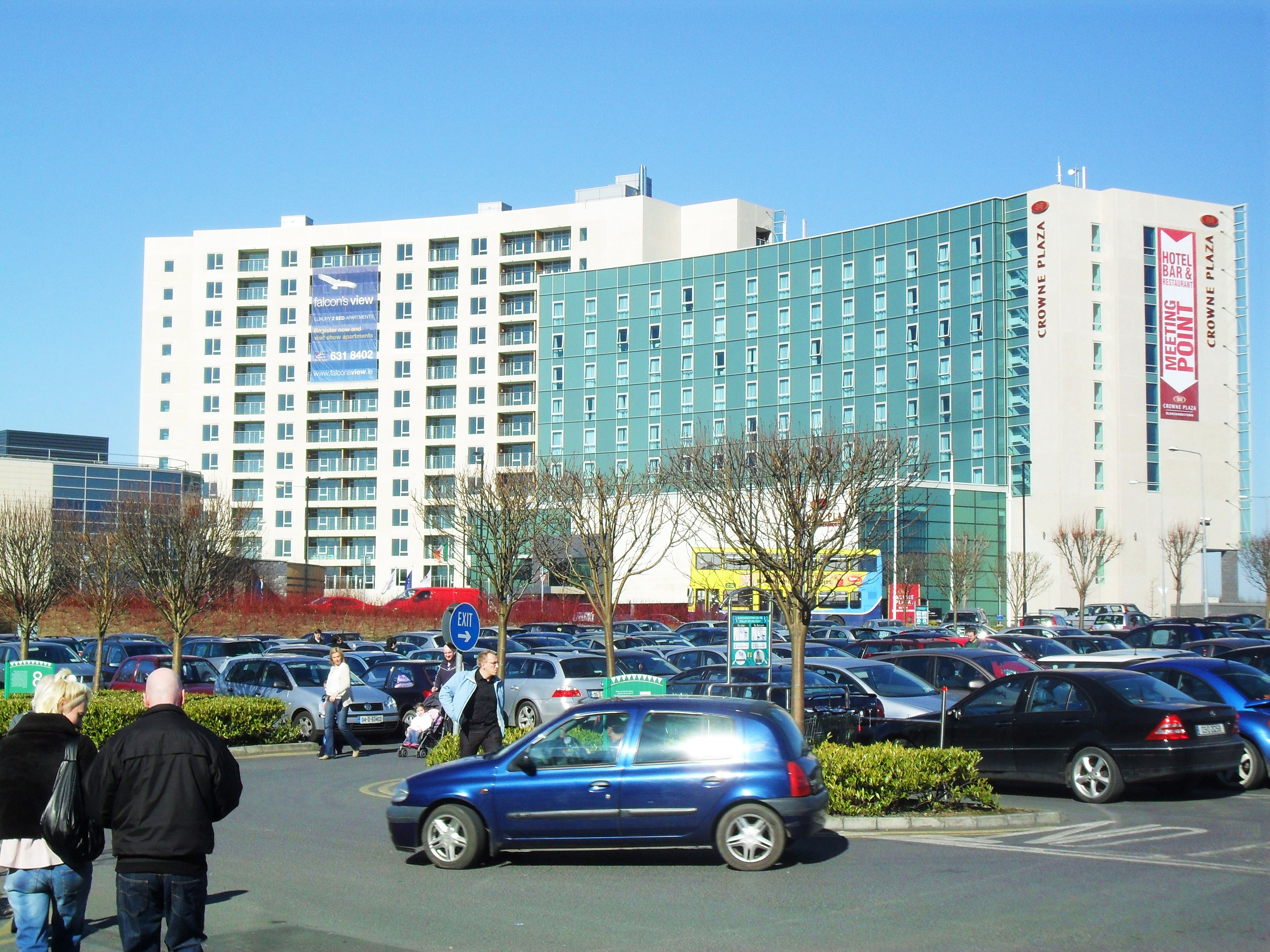
Crowne Plaza Hotel, Blanchardstown, one of the hotels providing mandatory hotel quarantine.

On 16 November, the Government announced a series of measures in a bid to curb the spread of COVID-19, with a closing time for bars, restaurants and nightclubs to be midnight, household contacts of a person with COVID-19 to restrict movements for five days and take three antigen tests, people required to work from home where possible and vaccination certificates required for cinemas and theatres. Additional measures were announced on 30 November, with parents of children aged 12 and under urged to reduce socialisation indoors, a negative test required for people arriving into Ireland from Friday 3 December, the re-establishment of mandatory hotel quarantine, the wearing of face coverings for children aged 9 years and over on public transport, in retail and for children in third class and above.

On 3 December, the Government reintroduced a series of measures that would commence from 7 December to 9 January amid concerns of the Omicron variant, with nightclubs to close, bars and restaurants to revert to six adults per table and no multiple table bookings allowed, indoor cultural and sporting events to operate at 50% capacity, a maximum of four households allowed to meet indoors, the Pandemic Unemployment Payment to be reinstated and the requirement of vaccination certificates extended to gyms, leisure centres and hotel bars. On 17 December, to curb the spread of COVID-19 over the Christmas period, the Government announced an 8 pm closing time for bars, restaurants, live events, cinemas and theatres that would commence from 20 December to 30 January.

== Living with COVID-19 (January 2022–present) ==
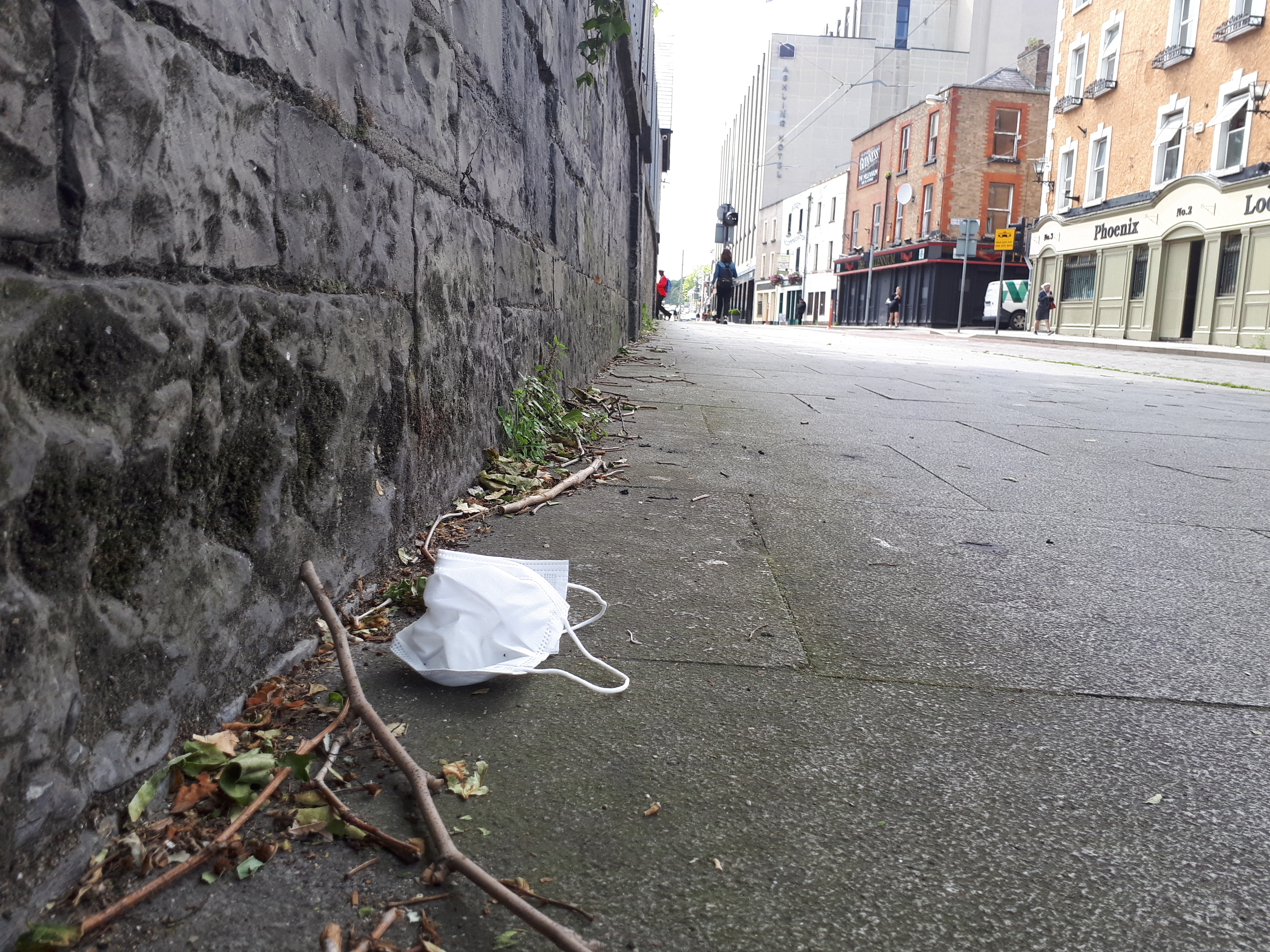
A discarded facemask on a Dublin street in June 2022.

After infections fell sharply following a fifth wave caused by the Omicron variant in late December 2021, Taoiseach Micheál Martin announced the easing of almost all COVID-19 restrictions from 6 am on 22 January 2022, but rules on the wearing of masks and isolation rules would remain. Remaining restrictions were lifted on 28 February; when announcing the change in policy on 21 January, Taoiseach Martin said "it is time to be ourselves again" and admitted that "the pandemic isn't over" and that "it will still require all of us to be vigilant." The Irish government titled its February 2022 plan to lift remaining restrictions "COVID-19: Reframing the Challenge, Continuing our Recovery and Reconnecting".

In September 2023, in response to lessons learned from the COVID-19 pandemic, the Irish government approved the establishment of a new health agency focused on infectious diseases, pandemic preparedness, and other emerging public health threats, based on recommendations from the Public Health Reform Expert Advisory Group.

== Vaccination strategy ==
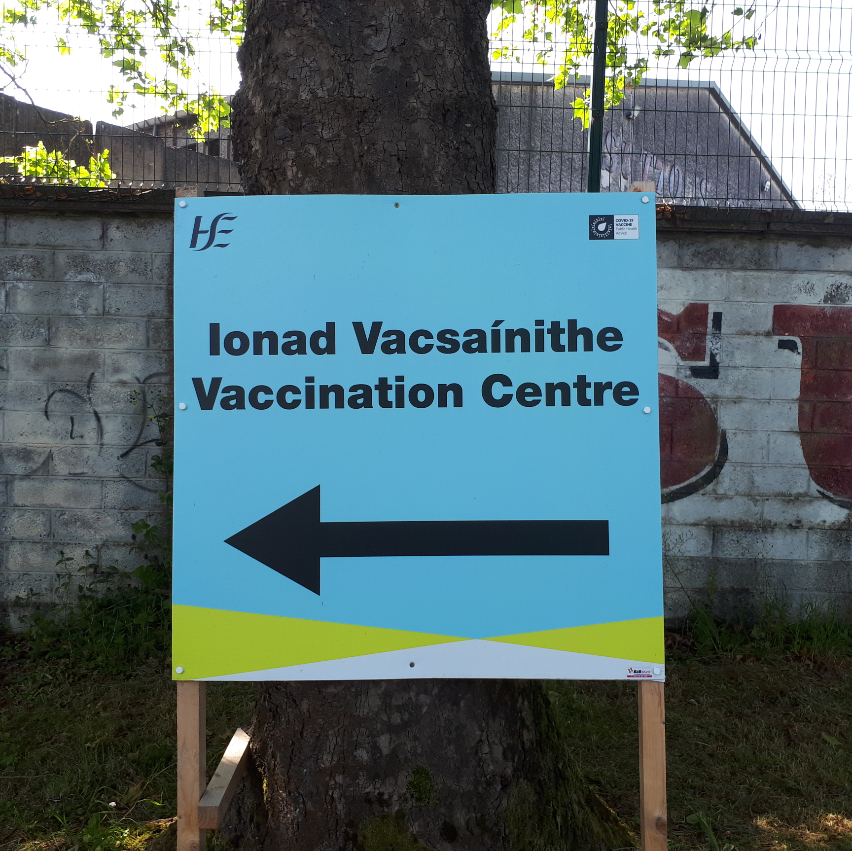
Large vaccination centres were put in place nationwide to administer COVID-19 vaccines

Vaccinations began on 29 December 2020 when Annie Lynch, a 79-year-old woman, became the first person in the Republic of Ireland to receive the Pfizer–BioNTech vaccine at St. James's Hospital, Dublin, and received the second dose three weeks later on 19 January 2021.

Ireland's vaccination rollout was praised as one of the most successful rollouts in the world and was ranked number one in the European Union in terms of its percentage of adult population fully vaccinated, and was also ranked number one in the EU for the number of booster vaccines administered.

Up to 40 large vaccination centres were put in place across the country to administer COVID-19 vaccines. Major facilities were put in place in Cork, Dublin, Waterford, Sligo, Galway, Limerick and Athlone, with smaller centres in Mullingar, Longford, Ennis, Nenagh, Bantry and Tralee.

== Financial responses ==
=== COVID-19 Pandemic Unemployment Payment ===
On 16 March 2020, Minister for Employment Affairs and Social Protection Regina Doherty announced the COVID-19 Pandemic Unemployment Payment, which was a government emergency aid program that provided monetary relief to those who face unemployment due to the pandemic, whether formerly employed or self-employed.

On 24 March, the amount of money distributed as part of the Pandemic Unemployment Payment was increased from €203 per week to €350.

The payment closed to new applicants on 22 January 2022, and officially ended on 25 March 2022.

=== Temporary COVID-19 Wage Subsidy Scheme ===
On 24 March, the Temporary COVID-19 Wage Subsidy Scheme was announced. This allowed employers maintain responsibility for paying employees during the pandemic with the intention of maintaining the employer-employee relationship and ensure that employees continued to be registered with their employers, so that they would be able to get back to work quickly after the pandemic. The Temporary COVID-19 Wage Subsidy Scheme replaced an earlier COVID-19 Employer Refund Scheme.

The scheme was replaced by the Employment Wage Subsidy Scheme in September 2020, which provided a flat-rate subsidy to qualifying employers whose turnover had fallen 30% based on the numbers of eligible employees on the employer's payroll, including seasonal staff and new employees.

=== July stimulus package ===
A financial package designed to help employers and businesses was announced by the government in July 2020.

==== Enterprise Support Grant ====
On 14 August, Minister for Social Protection Heather Humphreys opened applications for the newly revamped Enterprise Support Grant, designed to assist people who transitioned from the COVID-19 Pandemic Unemployment Payment into self-employment since 18 May. The Enterprise Support Grant was worth up to €1,000 per person and is aimed at sole traders such as plumbers, electricians, carpenters and taxi drivers, who did not pay commercial rates.

==== Stay and Spend Scheme ====
On 3 September, as part of the July Jobs Stimulus, Taoiseach Micheál Martin, Minister for Finance Paschal Donohoe and Minister for Tourism, Culture, Arts, Gaeltacht, Sport and Media Catherine Martin launched the Stay and Spend Scheme to help drive sales in the hospitality sector during the off-season which has been negatively impacted as a result of COVID-19, which will run from 1 October 2020 to 30 April 2021. The scheme provided a maximum of €125 in income tax credits to tax-payers who spent up to €625 in restaurants, pubs, hotels, B&Bs and other qualifying businesses.

==== COVID-19 Credit Guarantee Scheme ====
On 7 September, Tánaiste and Minister for Enterprise, Trade and Employment Leo Varadkar, Minister for Finance Paschal Donohoe, Minister for Public Expenditure and Reform Michael McGrath and Minister for Agriculture, Food and the Marine Charlie McConalogue opened the new €2 billion COVID-19 Credit Guarantee Scheme to provide Irish businesses, including those in the farming and fishing sectors, with access to low cost loans as they respond to the impacts of COVID-19. The scheme allowed small and medium-sized enterprises to borrow up to €1 million, with 80% of the loan guaranteed by the state. The COVID-19 Credit Guarantee Scheme was the largest state-backed loan guarantee for businesses in the history of Ireland.

=== Economic Recovery Plan 2021 ===
A second financial package was announced by the government in June 2021 to achieve rapid job creation and economic growth after the pandemic.

The plan set out a new phase of supports, investment and policies for a new stage of economic recovery and renewal, with new measures for businesses and affected sectors, and details for existing emergency pandemic financial supports including the COVID-19 Restrictions Support Scheme, Employment Wage Subsidy Scheme and Pandemic Unemployment Payment, giving certainty to businesses and employees and for those who needed it most.

== Reception ==
=== Public opinion ===
According to a study in June 2022 by Policy Expertise and Trust in Action (PERITIA), a University College Dublin-lead European Commission Horizon 2020 project, almost 75% of people in Ireland believed the government's response to COVID-19 was motivated by protecting its own reputation. It found that 58% of Irish people felt "making lots of money" from the pandemic was also a priority for the government.

=== Within the government ===
On 24 February 2021, Tánaiste Leo Varadkar addressed a meeting of Fine Gael TDs, Senators and MEPs and stated that criticism of how the Government had been communicating was reasonable, had been heard loud and clear, and would be taken on board, after a number of Fine Gael politicians launched an attack on Taoiseach Micheál Martin over his handling of the COVID-19 pandemic.

Former Fine Gael minister John Paul Phelan started the backlash during the meeting and stated that the Taoiseach's performance had been "appalling" and said the party's membership were "livid".

Fine Gael Leader of Seanad Éireann Regina Doherty stated that Fianna Fáil had "destroyed" the good work her party did during the first wave of COVID-19.

Frances Fitzgerald MEP, former Tánaiste and Minister for Justice, criticised Martin for saying "nothing new" in his address to the nation on 23 February and former Minister for Rural and Community Development Michael Ring stated the Government's performance over the last two weeks had been a "disgrace" and also stated that they had lost the trust of the people.

On 25 February, the Leader of the Green Party and Minister for the Environment, Climate, Communications and Transport Eamon Ryan defended accusations of "unholy mess" in the Government's handling of the COVID-19 pandemic, and by 26 February, Taoiseach Micheál Martin faced growing anger within his own party over his handling of the pandemic. Kildare North TD James Lawless stated that the extension of the Level 5 lockdown was "largely predictable" and called on the Government to give people hope, while a number of TDs and senators privately stated that they were disillusioned with the party and insisted change was needed sooner rather than later.

=== Protests ===
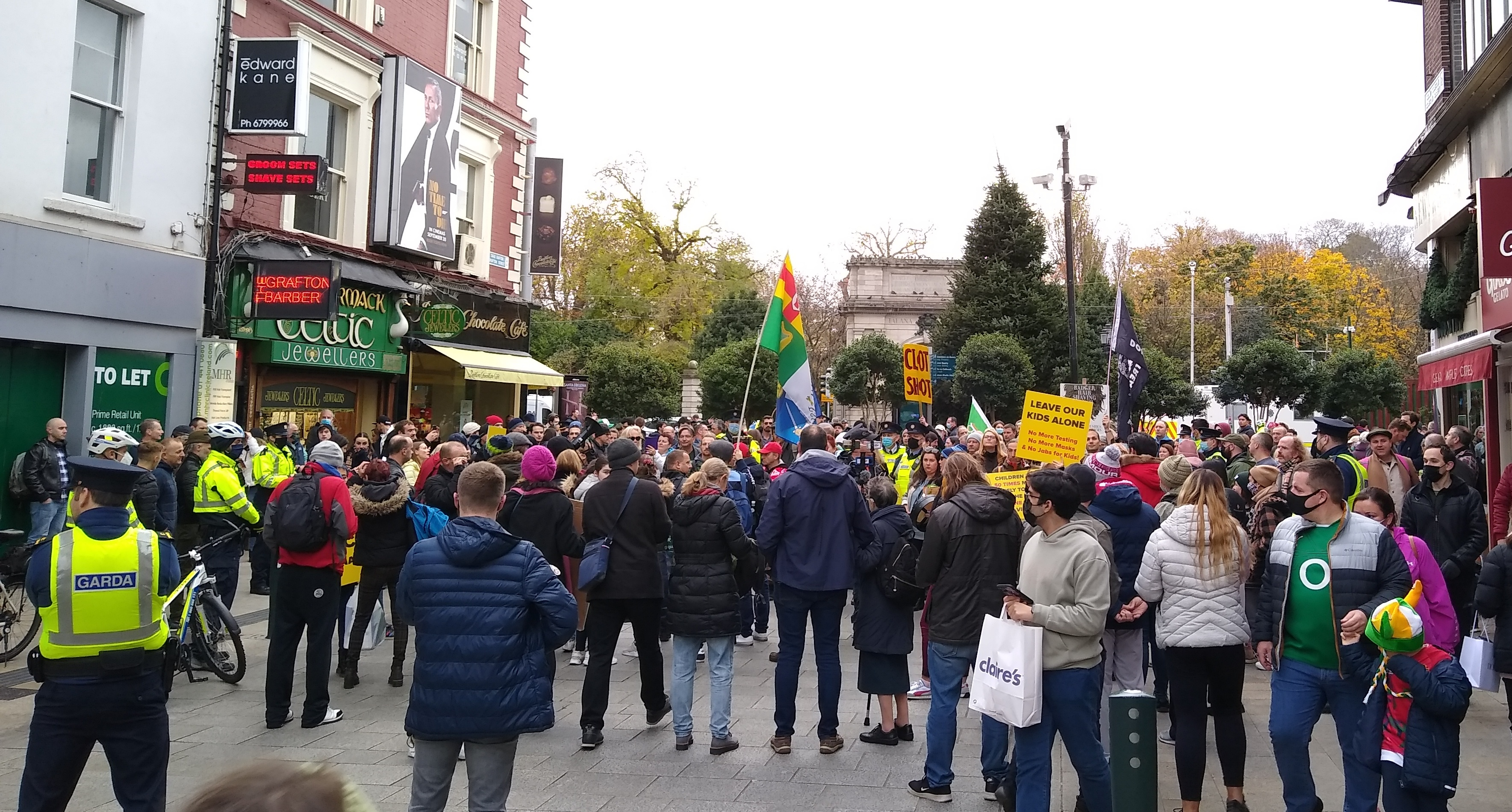
A protest against COVID-19 vaccination in Dublin

On 22 August 2020, four men were arrested after around 500 people attended an anti-lockdown rally organised by the Yellow Vests Ireland group at Custom House Quay in Dublin.

On 12 September, around 3,000 attended two anti-mask protests organised by the Yellow Vests Ireland group at Custom House Quay in Dublin. The next day on 13 September, gardaí began an investigation of an assault of an activist following clashes between an anti-mask group and a counter-protest outside Leinster House.

On 27 February 2021, 23 people were arrested and 3 Gardaí were injured (including one hospitalised), as around 500 protesters took part in an anti-lockdown protest in Dublin city centre, with fireworks being fired at Gardaí, while St Stephen's Green and the Iveagh Gardens closed in advance of the protest. The protest was widely condemned by the gardaí and politicians. The violent protest resulted in 13 people, including 12 men and 1 woman, charged and remanded in custody for public order offences.

A series of riots began in Dublin's south city centre on the night of 4 June 2021 over the June bank holiday weekend, in which glass bottles and other objects were thrown at members of the Garda Síochána. A number of public order incidents began when Gardaí attempted to disperse large organised groups congregating at a number of locations including South William Street, St Stephen's Green and Temple Bar Square.

== See also ==
- Social impact of the COVID-19 pandemic in the Republic of Ireland
  - Impact of the COVID-19 pandemic on education in the Republic of Ireland
  - Impact of the COVID-19 pandemic on politics in the Republic of Ireland
  - Impact of the COVID-19 pandemic on sports in the Republic of Ireland
- Economic impact of the COVID-19 pandemic in the Republic of Ireland
