= COVID-19 protests in the Republic of Ireland =

COVID-19 anti-lockdown protests in the Republic of Ireland
- Part of protests over responses to the COVID-19 pandemic
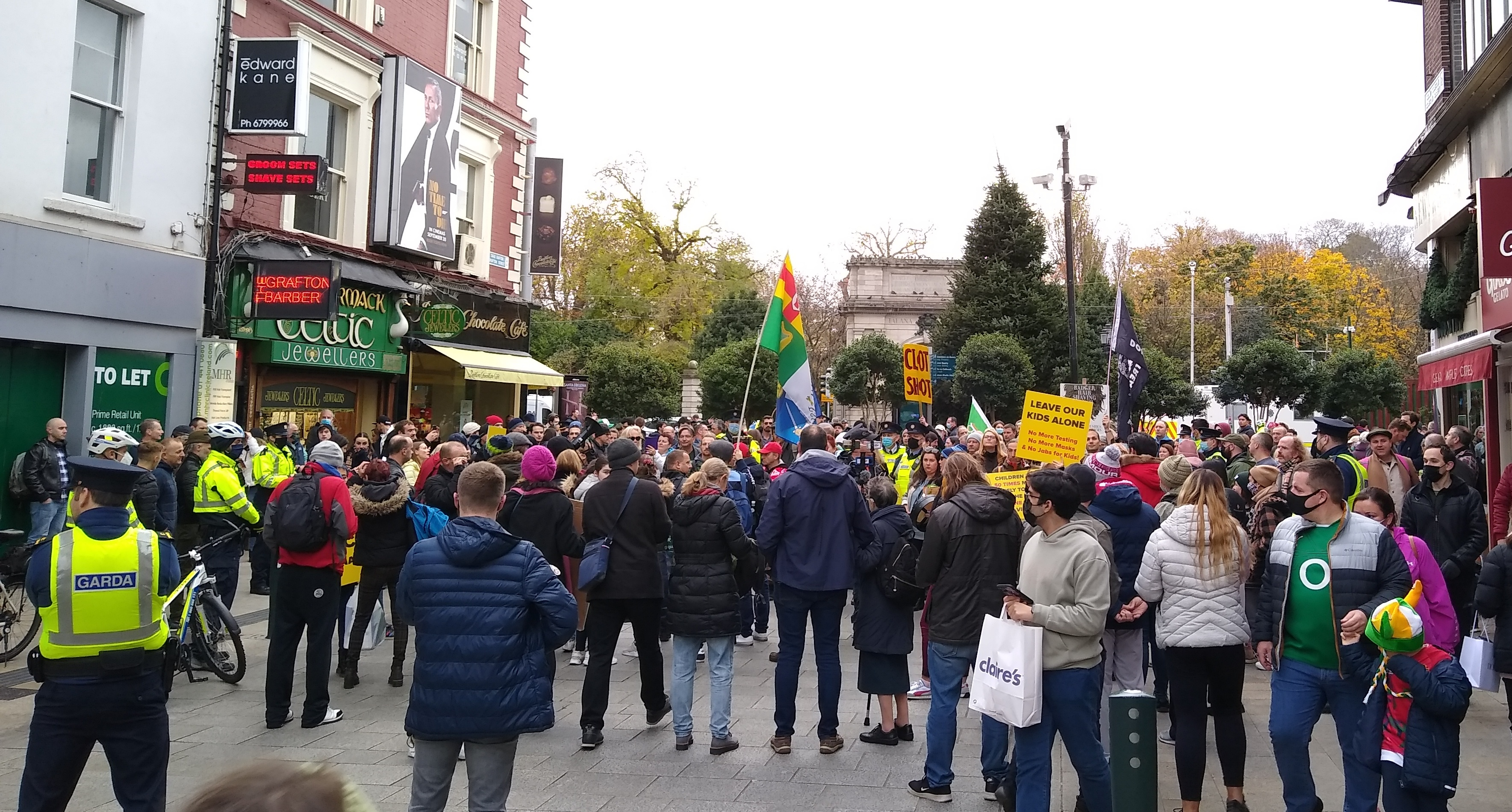
- Protest against COVID-19 vaccines in Dublin, November 2021
- Date: 22 August 2020 — 28 February 2022
- Location: Ireland, particularly Dublin
- Caused by: Opposition to the Irish government response to the COVID-19 pandemic; Opposition to vaccination
- Goals: Ending COVID-19 restrictions in the Republic of Ireland
- Methods: Peaceful protesting; Defying social distancing
- Status: End of protest; Most of the COVID-19 measures lifted on 28 February 2022

During the COVID-19 pandemic in the Republic of Ireland, numerous protests took place over the government's response.

Anti-lockdown protests took place in opposition to restrictions, starting in March 2020 against the first national lockdown, and continuing during subsequent lockdowns and other regional restriction systems. These overlapped with anti-vaccination protests, which continued after the start of the Ireland's vaccination programme in December 2020.

== 2020 ==
On 22 August 2020, four men were arrested after around 500 people attended an anti-lockdown rally organised by the Yellow Vests Ireland group at Custom House Quay in Dublin.

On 12 September, around 3,000 attended two anti-mask protests organised by the Yellow Vests Ireland group at Custom House Quay in Dublin. The next day on 13 September, gardaí began an investigation of an assault of an activist following clashes between an anti-mask group and a counter-protest outside Leinster House.

On 10 October, two men were arrested after a total of 250 demonstrators attended an anti-lockdown protest organised by the National Party outside Leinster House in Dublin.

== 2021 ==
On 27 February 2021, 23 people were arrested and 3 Gardaí were injured (including one hospitalised), as around 500 protesters took part in an anti-lockdown protest in Dublin city centre, with fireworks being fired at Gardaí, while St Stephen's Green and the Iveagh Gardens closed in advance of the protest. The protest was widely condemned by the gardaí and politicians. Taoiseach Micheál Martin stated that he "utterly condemned" the protest, which "posed an unacceptable risk to both the public and Gardaí" and also praised the Gardaí who moved quickly to make arrests and restore order. Tánaiste Leo Varadkar stated that he was horrified and that there was no excuse for violence to Gardaí or anyone, while Minister for Justice Helen McEntee stated that the situation was "completely unacceptable and was an insult to so many who had worked so hard in the fight against COVID-19 and to those who had died". The violent protest resulted in 13 people, including 12 men and 1 woman, charged and remanded in custody for public order offences, while Tánaiste Leo Varadkar stated that the violence on the streets of Dublin was "not a protest and was a riot". On 2 March, a man in his 30s was arrested in connection with the firework attack on Gardaí at the violent anti-lockdown protest on 27 February. The next day on 3 March, Jake Merriman, a 30-year-old man, appeared in court charged in connection with the firework attack on Gardaí. Seven months later on 28 October, Merriman was further charged with endangerment of life by launching a firework at Gardaí. He was accused of possessing glass bottles capable of causing serious injury, violent disorder, and endangering life by propelling a lighted firework causing a substantial risk of death or serious harm.

On 6 March, Gardaí arrested 6 people (5 men and 1 woman) as around 450 people attended an anti-lockdown protest in Cork city centre that ended without incident.

On St Patrick's Day 2021, Gardaí arrested 21 people after around 700 protestors took part in a number of anti-lockdown protests in Dublin city centre, Herbert Park and at the RTÉ campus in Donnybrook. One day later on 18 March, it was confirmed that 7 Gardaí were injured (including five hospitalised) after being kicked, punched and spat at during the separate violent anti-lockdown protests that took place on St Patrick's Day.

On 20 March, Gardaí arrested 11 people and issued a number of fines after around 200 protestors took part in an anti-lockdown protest in the Phoenix Park in Dublin city centre.

On 3 April, around 300 protestors took part in an anti-lockdown protest at the National Monument on the Grand Parade in Cork city centre. One day later on 4 April (Easter Sunday), Gardaí arrested 8 people as part of a policing plan around an anti-lockdown protest planned in Dublin city centre.

A series of riots began in Dublin, Ireland on the night of 4 June 2021 over the June bank holiday weekend, in which glass bottles and other objects were thrown at members of the Garda Síochána. A number of public order incidents began when Gardaí attempted to disperse large organised groups congregating at a number of locations including South William Street, St Stephen's Green and Temple Bar Square.

On the night of 14 July, hundreds of people gathered outside the Convention Centre in Dublin to protest against the Government's response to the COVID-19 pandemic after the Dáil passed legislation to allow for the reopening of indoor dining.

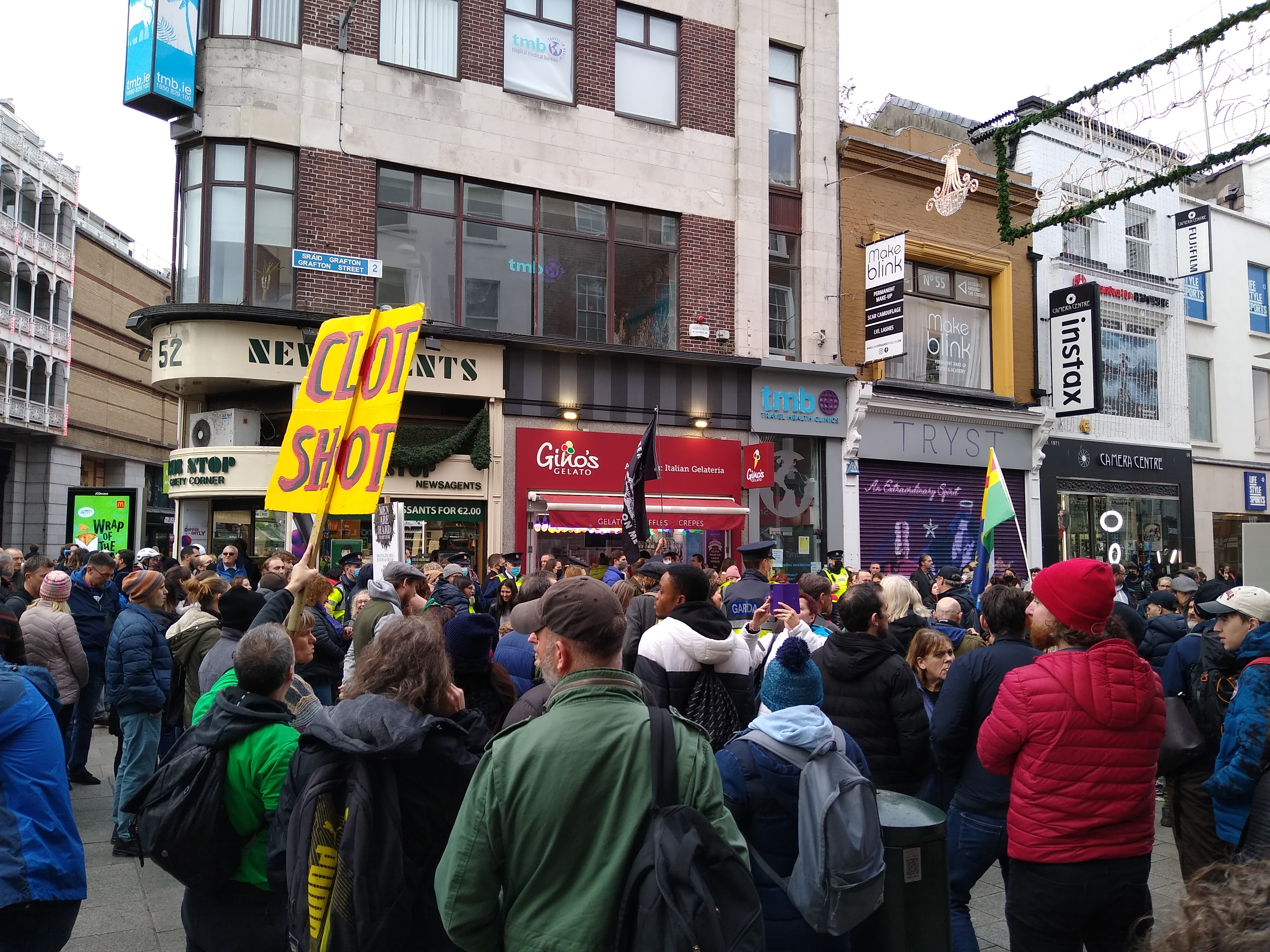
A protest against COVID-19 vaccines in Dublin

On 24 July, around 1,500 protestors gathered in Dublin city centre to protest against vaccines, new legislation allowing for the reopening of indoor dining and the EU Digital COVID Certificate.

On 27 November, thousands of people attended a protest against COVID-19 restrictions and vaccine passports at the GPO on Dublin's O'Connell Street.

== 2022 ==
On 22 January 2022, despite the easing of almost all COVID-19 restrictions, around 1,000 people gathered at the Garden of Remembrance in Dublin city centre calling for the end of all restrictions and the end of face masks for children in schools.

== See also ==
- COVID-19 pandemic in the Republic of Ireland
  - Irish government response to the COVID-19 pandemic
- COVID-19 vaccine misinformation and hesitancy
- Misinformation related to vaccination

== Bibliography ==
- Hamilton, Claire (March 2022). Treiber, Kyle (ed.). "Crime, justice, and criminology in the Republic of Ireland". European Journal of Criminology. 20 (5). Los Angeles and London: SAGE Publications on behalf of the European Society of Criminology: 1597–1620. doi:10.1177/14773708211070215. ISSN 1741-2609. S2CID 247203994.
