= RTÉ Investigates: Covid-19 – The Third Wave =

- Genre: COVID-19 documentary film
- Created by: Raidió Teilifís Éireann (RTÉ)
- Country of origin: Ireland
- Original language: English

Production
- Production locations: Tallaght University Hospital, County Dublin

Original release
- Network: RTÉ One
- Release: 9 February 2021

RTÉ Investigates: Covid-19 – The Third Wave is an Irish COVID-19 documentary film, which featured the behind the scenes of frontline staff at Tallaght University Hospital fighting to keep COVID-19 patients alive during the third wave of the virus in the Republic of Ireland. Aired on 9 February 2021 on RTÉ One, it took viewers into the heart of the hospital where frontline staff faced enormous challenges.

Following on from RTÉ Investigates: Inside Ireland's Covid Battle documentaries filmed at St. James's Hospital in June 2020, the RTÉ Investigates team returned going behind the scenes in another Irish hospital to see what had changed on the frontline six months later in Ireland. The RTÉ Investigates team filmed at the peak of the pandemic in January 2021 and highlighted the bravery, courage and dedication of frontline staff and patients that battled to beat the virus. The increased spread of COVID-19 during December 2020 due to new variants of the disease left hospitals nationwide facing a massive spike in confirmed cases requiring critical care. By mid-January, intensive care units were full with many hospitals forced to use their surge capacity and in Tallaght University Hospital, some operating theatres were converted into ICU wards.
