= Timeline of the COVID-19 pandemic in the Republic of Ireland (2020) =

Daily events related to the COVID-19 pandemic in the Republic of Ireland in 2020

The following is a timeline of the COVID-19 pandemic in Ireland in 2020.

== Timeline ==
=== January 2020 ===
- 27 January – The National Public Health Emergency Team (NPHET) for COVID-19 was created to co-ordinate the national response to the pandemic.

=== February 2020 ===
- 5 February – The Coronavirus Expert Advisory Group—a subgroup of NPHET chaired by Dr Cillian de Gascun, the UCD-based Director of the National Virus Reference Laboratory – met for the first time in Dublin.
- 29 February
  - The first confirmed case in Ireland was announced involving a male student from the east of the country, who had arrived there from Northern Italy. Ireland subsequently entered the Containment Phase.
  - Authorities shut a secondary school linked to the case as a precautionary measure. The State did not name the school involved, but—shortly afterwards—the Irish Examiner's Political Editor, Daniel McConnell, tweeted a copy of the letter it had sent to parents informing them it would close.

=== March 2020 ===
- 3 March – A second case was confirmed of a female in the east of the country who had been to Northern Italy. She had no contact with the first case.
- 4 March – Four more cases were confirmed, two females and two males in the west of the country who travelled from Northern Italy, bringing the total to six.
- 5 March – Seven more cases were confirmed, bringing the total to 13. Four of the cases were related to travel from Northern Italy—four males from the east of the country—one of these four cases was connected to Trinity College Dublin. Two of the seven cases were associated with close contact with a confirmed case—two females in the west of the country. One of the seven cases was a male in the south of the country who had no history of travel abroad.
- 6 March
  - It was reported that more than 60 staff at Cork University Hospital would have to self-isolate following a case of community transmission of COVID-19 at the hospital.
  - The same day brought confirmation of five more cases, bringing the total in the country at that time to 18.
- 11 March
  - An elderly patient in Naas General Hospital in County Kildare (south-west of the country's capital city, Dublin) became Ireland's first fatality from the virus; nine new cases were announced. This brought confirmed cases to 43.
  - Cork University Hospital discharged a patient who had been admitted for coronavirus disease after they made a full recovery.
- 12 March
  - 27 new cases were confirmed, bringing the total cases in the country to 70.
  - In response to the increase of cases, Taoiseach Leo Varadkar announced the closure of all schools, colleges and childcare facilities until 29 March. The announcement, which came one day after the World Health Organization formally declared that the outbreak was pandemic, also marked Ireland's movement from the Containment Phase in its strategy to combat the spread of the virus (a strategy which the Department of the Taoiseach had reaffirmed just three days earlier) towards the Delay Phase.
- 13 March – Following the introduction of restrictions on social gatherings, RTÉ One aired the first edition of The Late Late Show to go ahead without a studio audience.
- 14 March – 39 new cases were confirmed and another death announced of a man in the East of the country with underlying medical conditions. This brought the total cases to 129, with 2 deaths in total.
- 15 March
  - 40 new cases were confirmed. The total number of cases stood at 169 with 2 deaths.
  - The Government of Ireland ordered bars and public houses to close and advised against house parties.
- 18 March
  - 74 new cases were confirmed, bringing total cases in the country to 366 with 2 deaths.
  - More detailed information about hospital statistics, age range affected, how COVID-19 was spreading, healthcare workers and cases by county was published by the National Public Health Emergency Team starting on this day. It showed that the virus was present in 23 of the 26 counties, with Laois, Leitrim and Monaghan the only three yet to record a case.
- 19 March – 191 new cases were confirmed, bringing total to 557. 1 new death was recorded, bringing the total to 3 deaths. The woman died in an isolation ward in St Vincent's Hospital. Her daughter later spoke to the media and urged the public to protect themselves from the virus.
- 20 March – 126 new cases were reported, bringing the total to 683. It was also confirmed that the virus had since infected Laois and Leitrim, leaving Monaghan as the last of the 26 counties.
- 22 March – 121 new cases were announced, bringing the total to 906. A fourth death was also announced, bringing the total number of deaths to 4. The man, who died at the Mater Hospital, was musical director of a choir in Dublin and former Head of Vocal Studies at the Royal Irish Academy of Music.
- 23 March – A further 219 cases and 2 more deaths were announced, bringing the totals to 1,125 cases and 6 deaths. Of those then diagnosed, 208 were health care workers.
- 26 March
  - 255 cases and 10 deaths were confirmed, bringing the total number of confirmed cases to 1,819, and the total number of deaths to 19, more than double the previous day's total.
  - According to Chief Medical Officer Tony Holohan, most of the deaths occurred in "institutional settings", i.e. hospitals and nursing homes. At this point, deaths began to accelerate rapidly.
- 27 March
  - 302 new cases as well as 3 new deaths brought the total number of confirmed cases and deaths to 2,121 and 22, respectively. Among the deaths was the country's first healthcare fatality, who was based in the east.
  - Taoiseach Leo Varadkar announced a national stay-at-home order with a series of measures which he summed up as: "Stay at Home" (subject to certain exemptions).
  - Merrion Street described it as "a more intensive phase in our response to COVID-19". The measures, which coincided with an escalating death toll, were also a response to increased reliance on intensive care units (ICUs) to treat critically ill patients, and an attempt to lower this number before capacity was reached.
- 31 March – 325 cases and 17 deaths were reported, bringing the total number of confirmed cases and deaths to 3,235 and 71, respectively.

=== April 2020 ===
- 1 April
  - An additional 212 cases and 14 deaths were reported, bringing the total number of confirmed cases to 3,447, and the total number of deaths to 85.
  - It was also announced that Chief Medical Officer Tony Holohan, who displayed signs of illness during the previous evening's news conference, had entered hospital for non-COVID reasons; Ronan Glynn (Deputy Chief Medical Officer and Head of the Department of Health's Health Protection Unit) took charge.
- 2 April
  - A further 402 cases and 13 deaths were announced, bringing the totals to 3,849 cases and 98 deaths.
  - Chief Medical Officer Tony Holohan said of the intensive care unit (ICU) figures: "Of 148 cases admitted to ICU, 25 of those cases have been discharged, sadly there have been 14 deaths from ICU and 109 remain in ICU. The median age of ICU admission is 62."
- 3 April
  - A further 424 cases and 22 deaths were reported, bringing the totals to 4,273 cases and 120 deaths.
  - One patient was discharged from Sligo University Hospital after being admitted to hospital for 10 days.
- 10 April
  - A further 480 cases and 25 deaths were initially reported by the Department of Health, bringing the totals to 7,054 cases and 288 deaths. It was reported that there was a discrepancy between the number of cases confirmed by Ireland's Department of Health and the ECDC, due to swab tests sent to Germany for analysis to clear the backlog and testing in Ireland. 14,000 samples returned from German labs, of which 1,035 tested positive, bringing the total number of confirmed cases to 8,089. 62 patients admitted to ICU were discharged as of that date.
  - Taoiseach Leo Varadkar announced that measures introduced on 27 March would be extended until at least 5 May.
- 11 April
  - A further 553 cases, together with an additional 286 cases from previous samples sent to Germany, and 33 deaths were reported, bringing the totals to 8,928 cases and 320 deaths.
  - Minister for Health Simon Harris said between 25,000 and 30,000 tests had been sent to Germany and "well over" half of the results had been returned, with the remainder due back by next week.
- 12 April
  - A further 430 cases, together with an additional 297 cases from previous samples sent to Germany, and 14 deaths were reported, bringing the totals to 9,655 cases and 334 deaths.
  - The National Public Health Emergency Team said there would be a "real danger" of a second wave of virus cases, if the changing of restrictions was not done correctly.
- 13 April
  - A further 527 cases, together with an additional 465 cases from the backlog of tests at the laboratory in Germany, and 31 deaths were reported, bringing the totals to 10,647 cases and 365 deaths.
  - Around 80% of cases are mild to moderate illness, close to 14% have severe disease and around 6% are critical.
  - The Minister for Health claimed Ireland's approach to tackling COVID-19 was the "right strategy" that was "going to save lives".
- 15 April
  - A further 657 cases, together with an additional 411 cases from the backlog of tests at the laboratory in Germany, and 38 deaths were reported, bringing the totals to 12,547 cases and 444 deaths.
  - Among the deaths announced, a 23-year-old said to be the youngest person to have died in the country at the time.
  - A spokesperson for the Ireland East Hospital Group confirmed the deaths of two healthcare workers, a man and a woman, at the same hospital in Kilkenny, the man having died at home the previous day and the woman having died in the hospital that day.
- 16 April
  - A further 629 cases, together with an additional 95 cases from the backlog of tests at the laboratory in Germany, and 43 deaths were reported, bringing the totals to 13,271 cases and 486 deaths. One death, previously reported, was de-notified.
  - The National Public Health Emergency Team reported that lockdown and other measures had driven the growth rate of the pandemic "as low as it needs to be" and was "close to zero".
- 18 April
  - A further 630 cases, together with an additional 148 cases from the backlog of tests at the laboratory in Germany, and 41 deaths were reported, bringing the totals to 14,758 cases and 571 deaths.
  - Chief Medical Officer, Tony Holohan, reported that the curve had flattened and that no peak would be coming. He said the lockdown should continue until 5 May and that the government should focus on contact tracing.
- 21 April – Chief Medical Officer Tony Holohan announced that 8,377 people had recovered in the community and that 856 people were discharged from hospital as of that date. It was also announced that one previously reported death was no longer classified as related to COVID-19.
- 24 April – A further 577 cases and 37 deaths, and 185 probable deaths were reported, and 2 deaths previously reported were reclassified as unrelated to COVID-19, bringing the totals to 18,184 cases and 1,014 deaths. The HPSC defined a probable death as "a death where a lab test had not been done but where a doctor believed a death was associated with current COVID-19." The total number of deaths included probable deaths in accordance with advice from the ECDC.
- 28 April – A further 299 cases were initially reported but the number was corrected to 229 by Chief Medical Officer Tony Holohan, and 59 deaths were reported, bringing the totals to 19,877 cases and 1,159 deaths. 2 previously notified deaths were de-notified.
- 29 April – Chief Medical Officer Tony Holohan said "We estimate that as of Saturday 25th April 12,222 COVID-19 cases (64%) in the community have recovered. 1,164 cases (6%) have been discharged from hospital which gives us a total recovery rate of 70%."
- 30 April – A further 359 cases and 43 deaths were reported, bringing the totals to 20,612 cases and 1,232 deaths. 1 previously notified death was de-notified.

=== May 2020 ===
- 1 May
  - Taoiseach Leo Varadkar announced the extension of the current restrictions to 18 May at the earliest.
  - A roadmap to easing restrictions in Ireland that included five stages was adopted by the government and subsequently published online.
- 6 May – Chief Medical Officer Tony Holohan announced that 17,110 had recovered in the community and that 1,399 people had been discharged from hospital as of that date.
- 13 May – Deputy Chief Medical Officer Ronan Glynn announced that 17,877 people had recovered in the community and 1,593 people had recovered in hospital as of 10 May.
- 15 May
  - Chief Medical Officer Tony Holohan announced seven children in Ireland had been identified with links to paediatric multisystem inflammatory syndrome, a new illness temporarily associated with COVID-19.
  - The Government confirmed that phase one of easing the COVID-19 restrictions would begin on Monday 18 May. Among the heritage sites reopening under phase one were Cong Abbey, Farmleigh, Kilkenny Castle, Knocknarea, the National Botanic Gardens and Trim Castle.
- 18 May – Ireland entered phase one of the government's roadmap of easing COVID-19 restrictions.
- 20 May – Deputy Chief Medical Officer Ronan Glynn announced that 21,060 people have recovered from COVID-19 as of 20 May. Tony Holohan was absent "at short notice".
- 24 May – Transport Infrastructure Ireland data and AA analysis recorded a traffic increase of 30% over the previous week on the M50 motorway.
- 27 May – Minister for Health Simon Harris announced that 22,089 people had recovered as of 27 May.
- 31 May – A further 66 cases and 2 deaths were reported, bringing the totals to 24,990 cases and 1,652 deaths. 1 previously notified death and 5 cases were de-notified.

=== June 2020 ===
- 3 June – Chief Medical Officer Tony Holohan announced that 22,698 people had recovered as of 31 May.
- 5 June
  - Taoiseach Leo Varadkar announced a series of changes to the government's roadmap of easing COVID-19 restrictions in Ireland, which he summed up as: "Stay Local".
  - The Government confirmed that "phase two plus" of easing the COVID-19 restrictions would begin on Monday 8 June.
- 8 June – Ireland entered "phase two plus" of the government's roadmap of easing COVID-19 restrictions.
- 10 June – Deputy Chief Medical Officer Ronan Glynn announced that 23,213 people had recovered, a rate of 92%. However he said that people who have recovered are experiencing longer term effects including fatigue and decreased exercise capacity.
- 12 June – Taoiseach Leo Varadkar announced that travel restrictions would remain in place and that nobody should leave Ireland for the purpose of tourism or leisure.
- 17 June – Deputy Chief Medical Officer Ronan Glynn announced that 23,308 people had recovered.
- 19 June – Taoiseach Leo Varadkar announced a further re-configuration of the government's roadmap of easing COVID-19 restrictions with hairdressers, barbers, gyms, cinemas and churches reopening from 29 June.
- 24 June – It was announced that 23,349 people had recovered as of 21 June, a rate of 92%.
- 25 June
  - The Government confirmed that phase three of easing the COVID-19 restrictions would begin on Monday 29 June.
  - Minister for Health Simon Harris announced that face coverings would be mandatory for passengers on public transport to allow capacity on buses, trains and trams to increase, with sanctions for non-compliance.
- 29 June
  - Ireland entered phase three of the government's roadmap of easing COVID-19 restrictions.
  - Remaining businesses reopened including all pubs serving food, cafés, restaurants, hotels, hairdressers, beauty salons and tourist attractions.
- 30 June – A further 11 cases and 1 death were reported, bringing the totals to 25,473 cases and 1,736 deaths.

=== July 2020 ===
- 2 July – Chief Medical Officer Tony Holohan announced that he was stepping back from his position to spend time with his family. Deputy Chief Medical Officer Ronan Glynn succeeded him as Acting Chief Medical Officer.
- 7 July – The Health Service Executive (HSE) released the COVID Tracker contact tracing app that uses ENS and Bluetooth technology to record if a user is in close contact with another user, by exchanging anonymous codes, with over 725,000 downloads within a few hours after its launch.
- 10 July – New Taoiseach Micheál Martin confirmed that the wearing of face coverings on public transport would be compulsory from Monday 13 July.
- 15 July
  - Taoiseach Micheál Martin announced that phase four of easing COVID-19 restrictions would not go ahead on 20 July and is postponed to 10 August.
  - Following a Cabinet meeting at Dublin Castle, the government announced five key priority areas:
    - Face coverings must be worn in all shops and shopping centres. Retail staff would also be required to wear them unless there is a partition in place or there is social distancing of 2 metres between them and customers.
    - Pubs, hotel bars, nightclubs and casinos would remain closed until 10 August. Pubs currently serving food can remain open.
    - Social visits to people's homes should be limited to a maximum of ten people from no more than four different households.
    - Current restrictions of 50 people in indoor gatherings, 200 at outdoor gatherings would be extended until 10 August.
- 19 July – A green list for safe travel, due to be published by the government on 20 July, was postponed due to ongoing negotiations in Brussels, where the Taoiseach was attending an EU summit. People coming into Ireland from countries on the list would not be required to quarantine for a 14-day period, as arrivals from countries not on the list would be.
- 20 July – Acting Chief Medical Officer Ronan Glynn said that public health officials are now seeing outbreaks on construction sites, in fast food outlets and supermarkets.
- 21 July
  - The Health Information and Quality Authority revealed that half of nursing homes inspected by the authority were not following proper infection prevention and control regulations.
  - Following a Cabinet meeting at Dublin Castle, the government agreed to add 15 countries to a green list from which people could travel to without having to restrict their movements for 14 days upon arriving in Ireland, and would be reviewed on a fortnightly basis.
- 23 July – The government launched a €7.4 billion July Jobs Stimulus package of 50 measures to boost economic recovery and get people back to work, with the COVID-19 Pandemic Unemployment Payment and the Temporary COVID-19 Wage Subsidy Scheme extended until April 2021.
- 27 July – The government announced a €376 million support package and roadmap to reopen all schools in Ireland at the end of August which included additional teachers and special needs assistants, personal protective equipment and stepped-up cleaning regimes.
- 30 July
  - A large increase of cases was caused by an outbreak at a dog food factory in Naas, Kildare and in cases associated with the construction industry.
  - Acting Chief Medical Officer Ronan Glynn announced that 24,000 people had recovered.
- 31 July
  - A further 38 cases and no deaths were reported, bringing the totals to 26,065 cases and 1,763 deaths.
  - Acting Chief Medical Officer Ronan Glynn announced that mass testing had taken place in relation to a number of known outbreaks.

=== August 2020 ===
- 3 August – Two groups representing publicans announced that they were calling for a compensation package for their members if pubs were not allowed to reopen on 10 August.
- 4 August – Following a Cabinet meeting at Dublin Castle, the government announced six key priority areas:
  - Phase four of easing COVID-19 restrictions would not go ahead on 10 August.
  - Pubs, bars, hotel bars, nightclubs and casinos would remain closed.
  - Restaurants and pubs serving food would have to close by 11pm, but takeaways and deliveries could remain open after that time.
  - Face coverings would be mandatory in all shops and shopping centres from 10 August.
  - Five countries were removed from the green list of countries that were safe to travel to.
  - Current restrictions of 50 people in indoor gatherings, 200 at outdoor gatherings would remain in place.
- 6 August – Following a significant number of cases confirmed, Acting Chief Medical Officer Ronan Glynn made an appeal to people in Laois, Kildare and Offaly to take particular attention if they were symptomatic, and double down on health measures.
- 7 August
  - Taoiseach Micheál Martin announced a series of measures for counties Kildare, Laois and Offaly following significant increases of COVID-19 cases in the three counties, which would come into effect from midnight and would remain in place for two weeks. Measures include:
    - Residents of the three counties would not be permitted to travel outside of their counties except for in limited circumstances including to travel to and from work.
    - Restaurants, cafés, pubs serving food, cinemas, gyms, theatres, museums, galleries, bingo halls, casinos, betting shops, leisure centres and other indoor recreational and cultural outlets would be closed.
    - All retail outlets may remain open but with strict adherence to public health guidelines, including the wearing of face coverings.
    - All indoor gatherings would be restricted to 6 people and outdoor gatherings restricted to 15 people.
- 10 August – Face coverings were made mandatory in all shops, shopping centres, libraries, cinemas, museums, nail salons, hairdressers, dry cleaners, betting stores, tattooists and travel agents, with fines of up to €2,500 or a prison sentence of six months to people who do not comply.
- 15 August – Acting Chief Medical Officer Ronan Glynn announced that Ireland was having multiple clusters with secondary spread of disease and rising numbers of cases in many parts of the country.
- 16 August – The Licensed Vintners Association called for a Dublin pub to be shut down after videos emerged on social media of customers and staff not adhering to COVID-19 guidelines.
- 18 August – Following a Cabinet meeting at Government Buildings, the Government announced six new measures because of the growing number of confirmed cases, which would remain in place until at least 13 September:
    - All outdoor events would be limited to 15 people
    - All indoor events would be limited to 6 people, except for religious services, weddings and businesses, such as shops and restaurants
    - Gardaí would be given new powers to enforce rules around social gatherings in restaurants and bars serving food, and in private homes
    - Restaurants and cafés could remain open with closing times of 11.30pm
    - People would be advised to work from home and to avoid using public transport, unless absolutely necessary
    - Sports events and matches would revert to behind closed doors with strict avoidance of social gatherings before and after events
- 19 August – Acting Chief Medical Officer Ronan Glynn spoke in a five-minute video shared by the Department of Health to clarify confusion over the public health measures announced on 18 August.
- 21 August – The Government announced that COVID-19 restrictions in counties Laois and Offaly would be lifted but restrictions in Kildare would be extended for another two weeks.
- 22 August
  - A 23-year-old woman in Dóchas Centre became the first prisoner in Ireland to test positive for COVID-19.
  - Four men were arrested after around 500 people attended an anti-lockdown rally organised by the Yellow Vests Ireland group at Custom House Quay in Dublin.
- 23 August – The Chair of the NPHET Epidemiological Modelling Advisory Group Philip Nolan announced that 100 children aged between 5 and 14 tested positive for COVID-19 in Ireland in the previous two weeks.
- 24 August – 15 employees tested positive for COVID-19 at three meat plants around the country.
- 26 August – A meat processing plant in Cahir, County Tipperary announced that 22 members of staff, along with 16 close contacts, tested positive for COVID-19.
- 27 August – The National Public Health Emergency Team recommended that the government don't reopen pubs on 31 August, while Acting Chief Medical Officer Ronan Glynn stated that case numbers in Kildare were not stabilising sufficiently to allow for lockdown restrictions to be eased early.
- 28 August
  - Minister for Finance Paschal Donohoe encouraged employers to register for the Employment Wage Subsidy Scheme which would replace the Temporary COVID-19 Wage Subsidy Scheme from 1 September 2020.
  - The Government announced a €16 million package of measures to help pubs, bars and nightclubs to reopen, including a 40% top-up of the restart grant. They also announced three new Gardaí enforcement powers to close pubs immediately that do not serve food or maintain social distancing on the premises.
- 30 August – Concerns were raised about breaches of social distancing after footage emerged on social media of people drinking and singing on the street of Killarney, County Kerry on the night of 29 August.
- 31 August
  - A further 53 cases and no deaths were reported, bringing the totals to 28,811 cases and 1,777 deaths. 2 previously notified cases were de-notified.
  - The Government announced the lifting of COVID-19 restrictions in Kildare with immediate effect.

=== September 2020 ===
- 1 September
  - A primary school class in Dublin was sent home after one pupil tested positive for COVID-19.
  - Over 22,100 employers registered for the new Employment Wage Subsidy Scheme which replaced the Temporary COVID-19 Wage Subsidy Scheme.
- 2 September
  - A second primary school class in Dublin was sent home after a number of pupils tested positive for COVID-19.
  - A primary school in County Clare closed for one week after a number of staff members were identified as close contacts of a case of COVID-19.
- 3 September – One primary school and one secondary school in County Kerry sent a number of students home after students tested positive for COVID-19.
- 5 September
  - Acting Chief Medical Officer Ronan Glynn urged people in Dublin to keep their social contacts as low as possible.
  - Church bells rang out across the country as the Minister for Justice Helen McEntee and 14 other people attended an outdoor, socially distanced ceremony at Collins Barracks, Dublin to celebrate National Services Day in Ireland, remembering all those in the frontline who died.
- 7 September
  - Over 61,000 students received their Leaving Certificate exam results with grades significantly higher than any other year on record.
  - Following new figures published by the CSO, Ireland was officially in recession after the economy shrank by 6.1% between April and June as the impact of COVID-19 brought the largest quarterly drop on record.
- 8 September
  - The Government announced that pubs not serving food in Ireland could reopen on 21 September with strict regulations in place.
  - The Irish Medical Organisation reported a surge in the number of children attending GPs for assessment for possible COVID-19.
- 9 September – The Government announced that measures introduced on 18 August would be extended until Tuesday 15 September as a new roadmap for "living with COVID-19" would be announced, which would include a colour-coded, five-level system to indicate what public health measures were in place in different areas of the country at any given time.
- 12 September
  - Gardaí received legal powers to close restaurants and pubs which did not meet COVID-19 restrictions after President Michael D. Higgins signed into law the Criminal Justice Enforcement Powers COVID-19 Bill.
  - Around 3,000 attended two anti-mask protests organised by the Yellow Vests Ireland group at Custom House Quay in Dublin.
- 13 September
  - Gardaí began an investigation of an assault of an activist following clashes between an anti-mask group and a counter-protest outside Leinster House on 12 September.
  - Gardaí increased high visibility patrols in Dublin to support the public health guidelines in place to reduce the spread of COVID-19.
- 14 September – The self-isolation period for patients who test positive for COVID-19 was reduced from 14 days to 10 days.
- 15 September
  - The Government announced a medium-term plan for living with COVID-19 that included five levels of restrictions, with the entire country at Level 2 and specific restrictions in Dublin including the postponement of the reopening of pubs not serving food.
  - Ceann Comhairle Seán Ó Fearghaíl announced that the entire government would have to restrict their movements after Minister for Health Stephen Donnelly felt unwell and contacted his GP for a COVID-19 test. Just after 9pm, it was announced that Donnelly had tested negative for COVID-19 and that the government no longer needed to restrict their movements.
  - The Department of Health confirmed that Acting Chief Medical Officer Ronan Glynn was later revealed to be also restricting his movements as he met members of the government on 14 September, while Minister of State for European Affairs Thomas Byrne had gone into self-isolation after getting tested for COVID-19.

==== Resilience and Recovery 2020-2021: Plan for Living with COVID-19 – Restrictions ====
Level	Social & Family Gatherings	Weddings	Indoor & Outdoor Events	Sports Training, Matches & Events	Gyms, Pools & Leisure Centres	Religious Services	Restaurants, Cafés & Pubs	Hotels, Guesthouses & B&Bs	Retail & Services	Indoor Cultural Venues	Domestic Travel	Public Transport	Schools & Childcare
1	Maximum 10 from 3 other households	Maximum 100 people can attend	Indoor: 100/200 depending on venue size; Outdoor: 200/500 depending on venue size	Normal training with protective measures; Matches & Events: 100 indoors/200 outdoor/500 stadia	Open with protective measures	50 people can attend	Open with protective measures	Open with protective measures	Open with protective measures	Open with protective measures	No restrictions	Off-peak hours	Open with protective measures
2	Maximum 6 from 3 other households	Maximum 50 people can attend	Indoor: 50/100 depending on venue size; Outdoor: 100/200 depending on venue size	Indoor training: pods of 6; Outdoor training: pods of 15; Matches & Events: 50 indoors/100 outdoors/200 stadia	Open with protective measures	50 people can attend	Groups of 6 from up to 3 households	Open with protective measures	Open with protective measures	Open with protective measures	No restrictions	50% capacity / peak-hours prioritised	Open with protective measures
3	Maximum 6 from 1 other household	Maximum 25 people can attend	No organised indoor events; Outdoor: gatherings of up to 15	Indoor training: 1 individual only; Outdoor training: pods of 15 (non-contact); Matches & Events: except specific exemptions	Individual training only	Services move online; 25 people can attend funerals	Range of restrictions up to and including no indoor dining	Services limited to residents only	Open with protective measures	Venues closed	Stay in your county	50% capacity, use only when necessary	Open with protective measures
4	No visitors	Maximum 6 people can attend	No organised indoor events; Outdoor: gatherings of up to 15	Indoor training: 1 individual only; Outdoor training: pods of 15 (non-contact); Matches & Events: except specific exemptions	Closed	Services move online; 25 people can attend funerals	Outdoor dining (maximum 15 people), takeaway or delivery	Existing guests & essential purposes only	Primarily outdoor essential retail/services	Venues closed	Stay in your county	25% capacity, avoid public transport	Open with protective measures
5	No visitors	Maximum 6 people can attend	No organised indoor/outdoor events	Individual training only & no events	Closed	Services move online; 10 people can attend funerals	Takeaway or delivery only	Essential purposes only	Essential retail only	Venues closed	Stay at home, exercise within 5 km	25% capacity, avoid public transport	Recommendations based on situation & evidence at time

- 17 September
  - The Department of Foreign Affairs added Germany and Poland to the government's travel Green List while seven countries were removed.
  - The NPHET advised the Government to implement Level 3 restrictions and stop indoor dining in restaurants and pubs in Dublin following a rise in confirmed cases in the capital over the last two weeks.
- 18 September – Following an announcement at Government Buildings, Taoiseach Micheál Martin confirmed that Dublin would move to Level 3 restrictions from midnight and would remain in place for three weeks until 9 October.
  - Under Level 3 restrictions:
    - All indoor museums, galleries, cinemas and other cultural attractions should close.
    - Visitors were allowed from one other household only.
    - No organised indoor gatherings should take place. Organised outdoor gatherings up to only 15 people were permitted.
    - People living in Dublin should remain in the county, with the exception of those who must travel for work, education and other essential purposes. People living outside of Dublin should not travel to Dublin, with the exception of those who must travel for work, education and other essential purposes.
    - Schools, early learning and childcare services should remain open.
    - Retail and services such as hairdressers and beauticians would remain open with protective measures.
    - Restaurants and cafes (including pubs serving food) may remain open for takeaway and delivery and outdoor dining to a maximum of 15 people. Hotels, guesthouses and B&Bs may remain open, but with services limited to residents.
- 19 September – Garda checkpoints were mounted across Dublin City and County as Operation Fanacht recommenced following the imposition of Level 3 restrictions.
- 21 September – Gardaí began a criminal investigation of a rave organisation in a flat complex in Dublin where a large crowd not abiding by COVID-19 restrictions gathered on the night of 19 September.
- 23 September – Tánaiste Leo Varadkar, Minister for Foreign Affairs Simon Coveney and Minister for Finance Paschal Donohoe were among the three Cabinet ministers who began to restrict their movements under COVID-19 public health advice.
- 24 September
  - Taoiseach Micheál Martin confirmed that Donegal would move to Level 3 restrictions from the midnight of 25 September and would remain in place for three weeks until 16 October, with pubs remaining open for takeaway, delivery and outdoor dining to a maximum of 15 people only.
  - The Department of Foreign Affairs updated the government's travel Green List which would come into effect from 28 September, adding Liechtenstein and removing four countries from the list.
- 25 September – Garda checkpoints were mounted across Donegal from midnight as Operation Fanacht recommenced following the imposition of Level 3 restrictions.
  - Minister for Further and Higher Education, Research, Innovation and Science Simon Harris announced that all higher education institutions had been asked to deliver lectures remotely where possible for the next two weeks.
- 29 September
  - A multi-agency meeting took place in Galway to discuss public health concerns after hundreds of students congregated in the city on the night of 28 September, while student house parties continued to be a problem in Cork city.
  - Following crime figures published by the CSO, the number of burglaries dropped by 52.8% between March and June, coinciding with the imposition of COVID-19 restrictions.
- 30 September – A further 429 cases and 1 death were reported, bringing the totals to 36,155 cases and 1,804 deaths. 14 previously notified cases were de-notified.

=== October 2020 ===
- 1 October
  - The Department of Health announced that Tony Holohan would return to his post as Chief Medical Officer from Monday 5 October.
  - The NPHET recommended to Government that a maximum of six people only from a single household should be allowed visit another home across the entire country, and that no counties were expected to see an upgrade in their level of COVID-19 restrictions.
- 2 October – As part of a policing plan at the University of Limerick, gardaí in Castletroy, Limerick shut down 35 student house parties, arrested 5 people for public order offences and trespassing offences, and issued 30 anti-social behaviour warnings and 70 on the spot ticket fines; 45 for alcohol consumption; 25 for illegal parking.
- 4 October – In a letter sent to the Government, the NPHET recommended the highest level of restrictions for the entire country – Level 5 for four weeks, following an unscheduled meeting chaired by Chief Medical Officer Tony Holohan.
- 5 October
  - The Government rejected the NPHET's recommendation to place the entire country under Level 5 restrictions, and instead moved every county in Ireland to Level 3 COVID-19 restrictions with improved enforcement and indoor dining in pubs and restaurants banned, which would come into effect from the midnight of 6 October until 27 October at the earliest.
  - Speaking on RTÉ's Claire Byrne Live, Tánaiste Leo Varadkar stated that the recommendation from NPHET to move to Level 5 "hadn't been thought through and there hadn't been prior consultation".
- 6 October
  - Large-scale garda checkpoints were mounted across the entire country as Operation Fanacht recommenced following the imposition of Level 3 restrictions.
  - 31 positive cases of COVID-19 were confirmed in a nursing home in Portlaoise, County Laois with 21 cases among residents and 10 cases among staff.
- 8 October – After a review on the basis of data from the ECDC, the Department of Foreign Affairs confirmed that from 12 October, there would be no countries on the Government's travel Green List.
- 9 October – University College Cork confirmed several cases of COVID-19 amongst students in a UCC-run student accommodation.
- 10 October – Two men were arrested after a total of 250 demonstrators attended an anti-lockdown protest organised by the National Party outside Leinster House in Dublin.
- 14 October
  - The Government agreed a nationwide ban on all household visits from the night of Thursday 15 October, except for essential reasons such as childcare and on compassionate grounds.
  - Taoiseach Micheál Martin announced that counties Cavan, Donegal and Monaghan would move to Level 4 restrictions from the midnight of 15 October until 10 November.
  - Under Level 4 restrictions:
    - No visitors to private homes or social gatherings would be allowed.
    - Up to 6 guests could attend a wedding ceremony and reception.
    - All gyms, leisure centres, swimming pools, museums, galleries and other non-essential businesses and services would be closed.
    - Up to 25 mourners could attend funerals.
    - Restaurants, bars and cafés could only open for takeaway and delivery.
- 16 October – The NPHET recommended to the Government to move the entire country to Level 5 restrictions for six weeks.
- 19 October – The Government agreed to move the entire country to Level 5 lockdown restrictions from midnight on Wednesday 21 October for six weeks until 1 December.
  - Under Level 5 restrictions:
    - People must stay at home.
    - People would be permitted to exercise within a radius of 5 km of their home.
    - Non-essential businesses and services would close.
    - Public transport would operate at 25% capacity for the purposes of allowing those providing essential services to get to work.
    - Pubs, cafés and restaurants may provide takeaway and delivery services only.
    - Schools, early learning and childcare services would continue to remain open.
    - There should be no organised indoor or outdoor events.
- 20 October – The Government agreed to give Gardaí new powers to fine people €1,000 who hold house parties and up to €500 who breach travel restrictions following the imposition of Level 5 restrictions.
- 22 October
  - The Government agreed to align Ireland with the new European 'traffic light' system to coordinate international COVID-19 travel restrictions coming into force on Sunday 8 November.
  - The Garda Síochána began a major high visibility policing operation to support the new public health restrictions to curb the spread of COVID-19 with over 2,500 gardaí deployed every day on 132 static and mobile checkpoints nationwide, as Operation Fanacht recommenced.
  - Schools nationwide were told to stop using ViraPro cleaning products and hand sanitisers, as they were being recalled because they contained methanol instead of ethanol.
- 31 October – A further 416 cases and 5 deaths were reported, bringing the totals to 61,456 cases and 1,913 deaths. 19 previously notified cases were de-notified.

=== November 2020 ===
- 7 November – Minister for Transport Eamon Ryan announced that anyone arriving into Ireland from Denmark would have to restrict their movements for 14 days over concerns of a new strain of coronavirus that emerged in Danish mink farms.
- 8 November
  - The Government was criticised for a lack of clarity on what COVID-19 restrictions would apply at Christmas after the Chair of the Irish Epidemiological Modelling Advisory Group Philip Nolan warned that strict limits would be needed on Christmas gatherings.
  - The EU's traffic light system for air travel came into operation in Ireland from midnight, with the European Centre for Disease Prevention and Control publishing a three-stage colour system map every week to indicate the level of risk in each area of the EU.
- 15 November – Furious reactions emerged on social media after hundreds of people, in breach of Level 5 COVID-19 restrictions, gathered drinking takeaway pints on the streets of Dublin city centre on the night of 14 November.
- 19 November – The ECDC moved Ireland from 'red' to 'orange' on the EU traffic light map for international travel after COVID-19 figures improved.
- 20 November – RTÉ's top news presenters apologised after being present at a gathering in Montrose where social distancing was not fully observed and presenters posed for photographs.
- 22 November – Nine males were arrested in connection with a series of minor public order incidents in Cork after footage circulated on social media showing large groups of people without masks and not adhering to social distancing regulations in the city centre on the night of 21 November.
- 26 November – The NPHET recommended to the Government that restaurants and pubs should only be allowed to offer takeaway and delivery service for the entire Christmas period.
- 27 November – The Government agreed the approach for easing restrictions, including a phased move to Level 3 restrictions nationally from midnight on Tuesday 1 December, with a number of exceptions in place for the Christmas period from 18 December.
  - From 1 December:
    - Non-essential retail, hairdressers, gyms, leisure centres, museums, galleries, libraries, cinemas and places of worship would reopen.
    - Households should not mix with any other households outside those within their bubble.
    - People should stay within their county apart from work, education and other essential purposes.
    - Face coverings would be recommended to be worn in crowded workplaces, places of worship and in busy or crowded outdoor spaces where there is significant congregation.
  - From 4 December:
    - Restaurants, gastropubs and hotel restaurants may reopen for indoor dining with additional restrictions.
    - Pubs not serving food would remain closed except for takeaway and delivery.
  - From 18 December to 6 January 2021:
    - Households could mix with up to two other households.
    - Travel outside your county to be permitted.
- 30 November – A further 306 cases and 1 death were reported, bringing the totals to 72,544 cases and 2,053 deaths. 3 previously notified cases were de-notified.

=== December 2020 ===
- 1 December
  - All non-essential retail shops, hair and beauty providers, gyms and leisure centres, cinemas, museums and galleries reopened after six weeks of closure.
  - The Government approved an advance purchase agreement for 875,000 doses of the COVID-19 vaccine produced by Moderna.
- 4 December – Thousands of restaurants, cafés, gastropubs and hotel restaurants reopened after six weeks of closure.
- 15 December – Minister for Health Stephen Donnelly announced the Government's National COVID-19 Vaccination Strategy, which outlined the country's high-level plan for safe, effective and efficient vaccination of Ireland, while safeguarding continued provision of health and social care services.
- 17 December – The NPHET recommended to the Government that the period of relaxed COVID-19 restrictions from 18 December be shortened to the end of the year as COVID-19 cases rise.
- 18 December – Chief Medical Officer Tony Holohan warned that Ireland must take immediate action to stop the spread of COVID-19 over the Christmas period.
- 20 December
  - The Government agreed to impose a 48-hour suspension on flights from the United Kingdom from midnight following fears over the spread of a new strain of COVID-19, while ferries would be limited to freight travel.
  - Gardaí broke up an organised "car meet" of 800 people in more than 250 cars that breached COVID-19 regulations on the night of 19 December in Little Island, County Cork.
- 21 December – Speaking at a COVID-19 press briefing, the Chair of the NPHET Irish Epidemiological Modelling Advisory Group Philip Nolan announced that a third wave of COVID-19 in Ireland was clearly underway.
- 22 December – The Government agreed to move the entire country to Level 5 lockdown restrictions with a number of adjustments from Christmas Eve until 12 January 2021 at the earliest.
  - Under Level 5 restrictions:
    - Restaurants and gastro-pubs must close at 3pm on 24 December (Christmas Eve).
    - Hotels may provide food and bar services to guests only after 3pm on Christmas Eve. Hotels may only open to guests for essential purposes after 26 December.
    - Up until 26 December (Saint Stephen's Day), visits from up to two other households will be permitted. Household visits would be reduced to one other household from 27 December.
    - From 1 January, no household mixing would be allowed except for compassionate, care or childcare reasons.
    - Non-essential retail would remain open but shops would be requested to defer January sales events.
    - No new inter-county travel would be allowed after 26 December.
    - Personal services, including hairdressers and barbers must close.
    - Gyms, leisure centres and swimming pools would remain open for individual training only.
    - Travel restrictions from the United Kingdom would remain in place until 31 December.
- 23 December
  - NPHET announced that the new variant of COVID-19 in the United Kingdom was now present in Ireland, based on a selection of samples analysed from the weekend.
  - All ministers in the Government began restricting their movements after it was announced that Minister for Agriculture, Food and the Marine Charlie McConalogue tested positive for COVID-19.
- 24 December – Restaurants, cafés, gastropubs, hairdressers, barbers and beauty salons closed again as Level 5 lockdown restrictions came into effect.
- 26 December – The first shipment of 10,000 Pfizer/BioNTech COVID-19 vaccines arrived in Ireland.
- 27 December – A ban on inter-county travel and family gathering restrictions came into effect from midnight following the reintroduction of Level 5 restrictions.
- 29 December – Ireland's COVID-19 vaccination programme commenced as a 79-year-old woman became the first person in the country to receive the Pfizer/BioNTech COVID-19 vaccine at St. James's Hospital, Dublin.
- 30 December – The Government agreed to move the entire country to full Level 5 lockdown restrictions from midnight until 31 January 2021 at the earliest.
  - Under additional Level 5 restrictions:
    - All schools to remain closed after the Christmas break until 11 January 2021. Childcare facilities and crèches to remain open.
    - All non-essential retail and services must close from 6pm on 31 December.
    - People must stay at home except for work, education or other essential purposes, and will be allowed to exercise within 5 km of home.
- 31 December – A further 1,620 cases (including 2 probable cases) and 12 deaths were reported, bringing the totals to 91,779 cases and 2,237 deaths. 1 previously notified death was de-notified.
