= Health (Preservation and Protection and other Emergency Measures in the Public Interest) Act 2020 =

Irish 2020 pandemic legislation

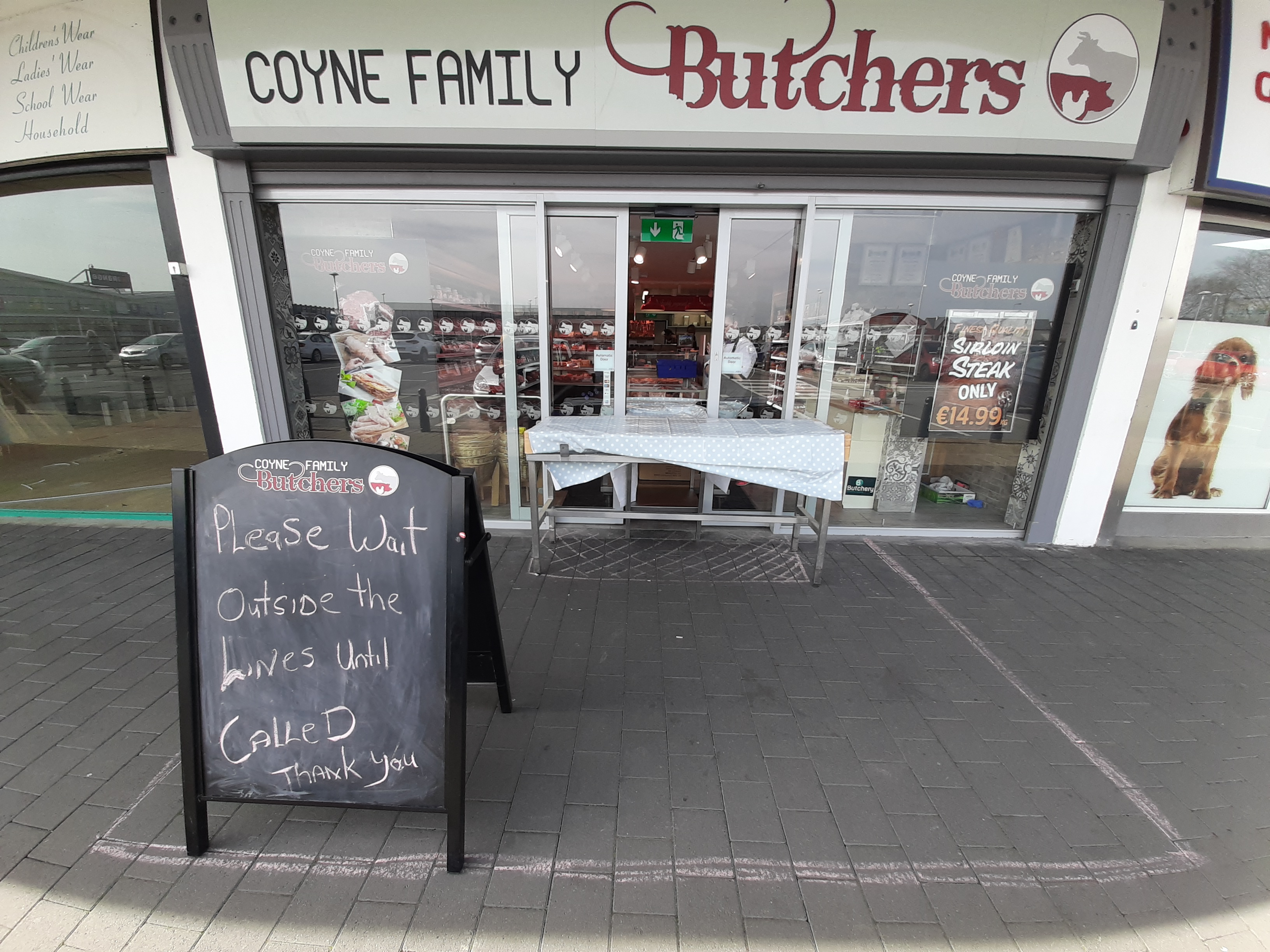
- Irish butcher implementing ad hoc social distancing measures

Oireachtas
- Long title: An Act, to make exceptional provision, in the public interest and having regard to the manifest and grave risk to human life and public health posed by the spread of COVID-19 and in order to mitigate, where practicable, the effect of the spread of COVID-19, to amend the Health Act 1947 to confer a power on the Minister for Health to make regulations prohibiting or restricting the holding of certain events or access to certain premises and to provide for enforcement measures; to provide for powers for certain medical officers of health to order, in certain circumstances, the detention of persons who are suspected to be potential sources of infection with COVID-19 and to provide for enforcement measures in that regard; and to confer on the Minister for Health the power to designate areas as areas of infection of COVID-19 and to provide for related matters; to amend and extend the Social Welfare Acts to provide for amendments in relation to entitlement to illness benefit for persons who have been diagnosed with, or are a probable source of infection with COVID-19; and to provide for amendments in relation to jobseeker's benefit and jobseeker's allowance to mitigate the economic effects of the spread of COVID-19; and to provide for related matters.
- Citation: Act No. 1 of 2020
- Territorial extent: Ireland
- Passed by: Dáil Éireann
- Passed: 19 March 2020
- Passed by: Seanad Éireann
- Passed: 20 March 2020
- Signed by: President Michael D. Higgins
- Signed: 20 March 2020
- Commenced: 20 March 2020
- Date of expiry: 31 March 2022

Legislative history

Initiating chamber: Dáil Éireann
- Bill title: Health (Preservation and Protection and other Emergency Measures in the Public Interest) Bill 2020
- Bill citation: Bill No. 3 of 2020
- Introduced by: Minister for Health Simon Harris
- Introduced: 16 March 2020

Amends
- Health Act 1947; Social Welfare Consolidation Act 2005

Summary
- Gives the state the power to detain people, restrict travel and keep people in their homes in order to restrict the pandemic
- Status: Expired

The Health (Preservation and Protection and other Emergency Measures in the Public Interest) Act 2020 (Act No. 1 of 2020; previously the Health (Preservation and Protection and other Emergency Measures in the Public Interest) Bill 2020, Bill No. 3 of 2020) was an Act of the Oireachtas (Irish parliament) which provided for additional powers for the state in the extraordinary circumstances of the spread of the COVID-19 pandemic.

Owing to social distancing measures required to combat the virus, and at the written request of Ceann Comhairle Seán Ó Fearghaíl, the Dáil sitting to discuss the legislation on 19 March was limited to 48 TDs (11 each representing Fianna Fáil, Fine Gael and Sinn Féin, four Greens, three members of the Regional Group and two members of all other parties and groups). The legislation passed all stages, and, following requests by opposition TDs, included a sunset provision for review in November. On 20 March, Seanad Éireann – also sitting in reduced numbers – passed the legislation after a three-hour debate. President Michael D. Higgins signed the legislation into law later that day, giving the state the power to detain people, restrict travel and keep people in their homes in order to restrict the pandemic.

This preceded the passing of the Emergency Measures in the Public Interest (COVID-19) Act 2020 by one week.

On 7 April, Minister for Health Simon Harris signed regulations under provisions inserted in the Act, to restrict movement of persons and the holding of events, effective 8 April to 12 April. This move, which Harris confirmed on Prime Time, gave gardaí extra powers to coincide with the Easter period. Harris signed the regulations after meeting Garda Commissioner Drew Harris and Attorney General Séamus Woulfe, with the delay attributed to governmental lawyer indecision over precise wording and exact nature of the powers.

The regulations that were in force included the Health Act 1947 (Section 31A – Temporary Restrictions) (Covid-19) (No. 10) Regulations 2020, which were repeatedly extended.

The Act expired at midnight on 31 March 2022.

== See also ==
- List of COVID-19 pandemic legislation
