= Economic Recovery Plan 2021 =

Irish response to the COVID-19 pandemic

The Economic Recovery Plan 2021 is a €3.5 billion stimulus package announced by the Government of Ireland on 1 June 2021 to achieve rapid job creation and economic growth after the COVID-19 pandemic. The plan sets out a new phase of supports, investment and policies for a new stage of economic recovery and renewal, with new measures for businesses and affected sectors, and details for existing emergency pandemic financial supports including the COVID-19 Restrictions Support Scheme, Employment Wage Subsidy Scheme and Pandemic Unemployment Payment, giving certainty to businesses and employees and for those who need it most.

== Four pillars of the plan ==
The Economic Recovery Plan is broken down into four pillars:

| 1 | Ensuring our public finances are sustainable for a lasting recovery |
| 2 | Helping people back into work by extending labour market supports and through intense activation and reskilling and upskilling opportunities, driven by Pathways to Work 2021–2025 |
| 3 | Rebuilding Sustainable Enterprises through targeted supports and policies to make enterprises more resilient and productive |
| 4 | A Balanced and Inclusive Recovery through strategic investment in infrastructure and reforms that enhance our long-term capacity for growth, balanced regional development and by improving living standards |

Helping people back to work – Reaching 2.5 million people in work by 2024.

Extension of supports

- Employment Wage Subsidy Scheme (EWSS) and Pandemic Unemployment Payment (PUP) extended for the rest of 2021 with phased adjustments

Practical supports such as individual advice, CV preparation and work placements

- Expanded Jobs Plus Scheme to 8,000 places
- Workplace Experience Programme, 10,000 participants by 2022

Upskilling and reskilling

- Accelerated availability of 50,000 extra education and training places
- Investment of €114m in education and training through Solas Recovery Skills Programme
- 10,000 additional apprenticeships per annum by 2025

Building sustainable businesses – Helping business to recover and embrace new opportunities.

Extension and enhancement

- Extension and enhancement of the COVID-19 Restrictions Support Scheme (CRSS)
- Extension of the Commercial Rates Waiver and Debt Warehousing Schemes
- New Business Resumption Support Scheme
- SME and Entrepreneurship Growth Plan – 2,000 additional SMEs to begin exporting by end 2025
- IDA 2021-2024 Strategy – aims to win 800 total investments to support creation of 50,000 jobs

Support and planning for sectors that have been particularly impacted by the pandemic

- Lower Tourism VAT rate of 9% extended to 1 September 2022
- Live Performance Support Scheme (LPSS)
- Music and Entertainment Business Assistance Scheme
- New events sector support scheme
- Fáilte Ireland initiatives including Business Continuity Scheme
- Roadmap for Aviation Recovery

Building resilient, productive and innovative businesses for the future

- Digital Transformation of Enterprise Fund
- National Artificial Intelligence Strategy
- Technological University Fund
- National Grand Challenges Programme

Recovery for all – Building on the lessons of the pandemic.

Supporting a digital and green economy

- €915 million of funding under the European Recovery and Resilience Facility
- Retrofit Loan Scheme

Balanced regional development

- Updated National Development Plan
- Brexit Adjustment Reserve (over €1 billion)
- Remote Working Strategy

Fair recovery

- Social dialogue
- Statutory sick pay
- Wellbeing Framework
- Just Transition

== Key elements of the plan ==
- A substantial extension of the Employment Wage Subsidy Scheme (EWSS), the Pandemic Unemployment Payment (PUP), and the COVID-19 Restrictions Support Scheme (CRSS), and considerable enhancement of both EWSS and CRSS
  - The Employment Wage Subsidy Scheme will be extended beyond 30 June until 31 December 2021
  - The Pandemic Unemployment Payment will be extended in full for existing claimants beyond 30 June to 7 September. The scheme will close to new applicants from 1 July in recognition that, at that stage, there should be no new job lay-offs that are directly attributable to public health restrictions
    - The current weekly rates of support will be gradually reduced over three phases by €50 increments. The first phase of rate changes will apply from 7 September provided progress on reopening continues. Two further phases of changes will take place over the following months, on 16 November and 8 February, if progress continues as expected
    - PUP claims for students will be extended until the start of the 2021/2022 college year (final payment on 7 September). In addition, €10 million in assistance will provide supports for the forthcoming academic year for students impacted by COVID-19
- Complemented by a range of initiatives including extension of Commercial Rates Waiver, new additional Business Resumption Support Scheme, and extension of Tax Debt Warehousing Scheme
- Continuing to provide supports for worst-affected sectors including aviation, tourism and events as they continue to reopen, including the extension of 9% VAT rate for tourism and hospitality sector, supports for live entertainment and events sector, and a roadmap for the aviation sector
  - A roadmap for the recovery path for the aviation sector is rooted in the reopening of international travel, supports for workers and sectoral specific supports
    - Non-essential travel can return from 19 July and for travel within the European Union area, Ireland will be operating the EU Digital COVID-19 Certificate
  - As part of Government's support for the tourism sector, the lower tourism and hospitality VAT rate of 9% will be extended to 1 September 2022, and Fáilte Ireland will continue its support initiatives including through its Business Continuity Scheme or equivalent schemes
- Strategic investment that will drive the digital and green transition, as well as supporting social and economic recovery and job creation
- Overarching ambition to exceed pre-crisis employment levels by reaching 2.5 million people in work by 2024
- Help people back into work, and into new sustainable job opportunities through increased activation, and reskilling and upskilling opportunities
- A pathway to a strong, resilient economy, aligned with the Government's green and digital ambitions
- Learn lessons from the pandemic by building a balanced and inclusive recovery, which leverages new ways of working, and by improving labour market supports and living standards
- Ensuring sustainable public finances for a lasting recovery

== See also ==
- July Jobs Stimulus
