= European Society of Criminology =

Learned society

- Abbreviation: ESC
- Formation: 2000; 26 years ago
- Membership: 1,560 members
- Headquarters: University of Lausanne, Lausanne, Switzerland
- President: Anna-Maria Getoš Kalac
- Journal: European Journal of Criminology
- Website: https://esc-eurocrim.org

The European Society of Criminology, often shortened to ESC, is a learned society dedicated to criminology in Europe. It was established in 2000, with its original goals including the creation of working groups on specific topics, one of the first being juvenile justice. Since 2004, it has published the European Journal of Criminology along with SAGE Publications. Since 2001, the society has held annual conferences, the first of which was held in Lausanne. As of 2024, the ESC has 1,560 members from 58 countries. 340 members or 22% of the ESC's total membership are from the United Kingdom.

== Controversy ==
The ESC has faced criticism for its collaboration with Israeli academic institutions complicit in atrocity crimes and other violations of international law. Notably, the ESC counts among its members and conference delegates scholars from Ariel University, an Israeli university located in the illegal Israeli settlement of Ariel in the occupied West Bank. Due to its location in Israeli-occupied territory, Ariel University is excluded from receiving funding as part of the Horizon 2020 research program signed between the EU and Israel in 2013. The university is also the subject of an academic boycott by organisations including the European Association of Social Anthropologists.

In the conference programme for the ESC’s 2025 conference, several speakers have their institutional affiliation listed as “Ariel University, Israel”. One of two host institutions, Panteion University, as well as the municipality of Athens, withdrew their patronage of the conference in protest at the inclusion of speakers from Ariel University in the conference schedule. A statement by Panteion University said that the university could not ‘engage in cooperation with institutions that, directly or indirectly, legitimize policies which, under present circumstances, contribute to the perpetration of war crimes’, and that ‘in a moment of grave international crisis, neutrality in the face of war crimes cannot be justified’. The opening of the ESC’s 2025 conference in Athens was protested by Greek Boycott, Divestment and Sanctions groups.
