= RTÉ Investigates: Inside Ireland's Covid Battle =

- Genre: COVID-19 documentary series
- Created by: RTÉ
- Country of origin: Ireland
- Original language: English
- No. of series: 1
- No. of episodes: 2

Production
- Production locations: St. James's Hospital, Dublin

Original release
- Network: RTÉ One
- Release: 29 June – 30 June 2020

RTÉ Investigates: Inside Ireland's Covid Battle is a two-part Irish COVID-19 documentary series, which featured the behind the scenes of the healthcare staff at St. James's Hospital fighting to keep COVID-19 patients alive in ICU. First aired on 29 June 2020 on RTÉ One, it reached an audience of over 755,000 after Taoiseach Micheál Martin said the programme was a "stark reminder" of COVID-19 as the country began to reopen after the lockdown. The second and final episode aired on 30 June 2020.

The RTÉ Investigates team spent 30 days filming inside the hospital in May and June 2020 with the co-operation of staff and patients. Before filming began, the team had to undergo hazard training provided by health and safety experts in the United Kingdom. RTÉ delivered Personal Protective Equipment to the hospital to cover the equipment used by the team during the filming.

== Awards ==
Award	Date of ceremony	Category	Result	Ref.
RTS Ireland Television Awards	31 March 2021	News and Current Affairs Award	Won	
