= European Journal of Criminology =

- Discipline: Criminology, criminal justice
- Language: English
- Edited by: Kyle Treiber

Publication details
- History: 2004-present
- Publisher: SAGE Publishing on behalf of the European Society of Criminology
- Frequency: Bimonthly
- Impact factor: 2.0 (2023)

Standard abbreviations
- ISO 4: Eur. J. Criminol.

Indexing
- ISSN: 1477-3708 (print); 1741-2609 (web)
- LCCN: 2005211118
- OCLC no.: 56561756

Links
- Journal homepage; Online access; Online archive

The European Journal of Criminology is a bimonthly peer-reviewed academic journal covering the field of criminology. The editor-in-chief is Kyle Treiber (University of Cambridge). It was established in 2004 and is published by SAGE Publishing on behalf of the European Society of Criminology.

== Abstracting and indexing ==
The journal is abstracted and indexed in Scopus and the Social Sciences Citation Index. According to the Journal Citation Reports, its 2023 impact factor is 2.0. It is the only criminology journal to have a truly international coverage.

== Editors-in-chief ==
The following persons are or have been editors-in-chief:

- 2001–2006: David J. Smith (University of Edinburgh)
- 2006–2011: Julian V. Roberts (University of Oxford)
- 2011–2016: Paul Knepper (University of Sheffield)
- 2017–2020: Dario Melossi (University of Bologna)
- 2021–present: Kyle Treiber (University of Cambridge)
