= Emergency Measures in the Public Interest (COVID-19) Act 2020 =

Oireachtas
- Long title: An Act, to make exceptional provision, in the public interest and having regard to the manifest and grave risk to human life and public health posed by the spread of the disease known as Covid-19 and in order to mitigate, where practicable, the effect of the spread of that disease and to mitigate the adverse economic consequences resulting, or likely to result from the spread of that disease and to mitigate its impact on the administration of vital public service functions; to make provision in relation to the operation of certain provisions of the Residential Tenancies Act 2004 during the period of 3 months following the enactment of this Act and such further period (if any) as may be specified by order of the Government; to amend the Planning and Development Act 2000 to provide, in certain circumstances, for the disregard of a certain period in the calculation of time limits referred to in that Act and in certain other enactments; to provide for the registration of certain health and social care professionals to fulfil the need for medical resources to alleviate the risk from Covid-19 to human life and public health and for those and related purposes to amend the Dentists Act 1985, the Health and Social Care Professionals Act 2005, the Pharmacy Act 2007, the Medical Practitioners Act 2007, and the Nurses and Midwives Act 2011; to make provision, due to the exigencies of the public health emergency posed by the spread of Covid-19, for certain amendments and modifications to the provisions of the Mental Health Act 2001 relating to the carrying out of reviews under section 18 of that Act; to amend the Defence Act 1954 to enable the re-enlistment of formerly enlisted persons; to enable the provision of a temporary wage subsidy to certain employees; to make provision in relation to the operation of certain provisions of the Redundancy Payments Act 1967 for a certain period following the enactment of this Act and such further period (if any) as may be specified by order of the Government and, for that purpose, to amend the Redundancy Payments Act 1967; to make provision allowing for the modified operation of certain aspects of the civil registration system, if required, for a limited period and such further period (if any) as may be specified by order of the Government, including by way of allowing certain persons to provide particulars to a registrar in writing rather than by appearing in person, and by allowing the staff of an tArd-Chláraitheoir to perform the functions of certain registrars in circumstances where the civil registration system is not available or able to perform its statutory functions as it ordinarily would be, and for those purposes, to amend the Civil Registration Act 2004; and to provide for related matters.
- Citation: No. 2 of 2020
- Passed by: Dáil Éireann
- Passed: 26 March 2020
- Passed by: Seanad Éireann
- Passed: 27 March 2020
- Signed by: President Michael D Higgins
- Signed: 27 March 2020
- Commenced: 27 March 2020

Legislative history

First chamber: Dáil Éireann
- Bill title: Emergency Measures in the Public Interest (Covid-19) Bill 2020
- Bill citation: No. 4 of 2020
- Introduced by: Minister for Health (Stephen Donnelly)
- Introduced: 24 March 2020
- First reading: 24 March 2020
- Second reading: 26 March 2020
- Third reading: 26 March 2020

Second chamber: Seanad Éireann
- Member(s) in charge: Minister for Health (Stephen Donnelly)
- Second reading: 27 March 2020
- Third reading: 27 March 2020

Keywords
- COVID-19
- Status: Current legislation

The Emergency Measures in the Public Interest (COVID-19) Act 2020 (Act No. 2 of 2020; previously the Health (Preservation and Protection and other Emergency Measures in the Public Interest) Bill 2020, Bill No. 4 of 2020) was an Act of the Oireachtas (Irish parliament) which provided for additional powers for the state in the extraordinary circumstances of the spread of the COVID-19 pandemic.

Owing to social distancing measures required to combat the virus, and at the written request of Ceann Comhairle Seán Ó Fearghaíl, the Dáil sitting to discuss the legislation on 26 March was "considerably reduced" in numbers and, after an amendment intended to guarantee against evictions, the bill passed without a vote. The bill then passed without a vote the following day (27 March) through all stages in Seanad Éireann (in its final sitting before the count of the Seanad election which followed the 2020 general election). President Michael D. Higgins signed the bill into law the same day.

Amongst other things, the Emergency Measures in the Public Interest (COVID-19) Act 2020 introduced the Temporary COVID-19 Wage Subsidy Scheme.

This followed the passing of the Health (Preservation and Protection and other Emergency Measures in the Public Interest) Act 2020 the previous week.

== Temporary COVID-19 Wage Subsidy Scheme ==
The Temporary COVID-19 Wage Subsidy Scheme provided for employers and employees of Ireland in the extraordinary circumstances of the spread of the coronavirus pandemic. The scheme allowed employers to maintain responsibility for paying employees during the pandemic, with the intention of maintaining the employer-employee relationship and ensuring that employees continued to be registered with their employers, so that they would be able to get back to work quickly after the pandemic.

The scheme was announced on 24 March for a twelve-week run beginning on 26 March, and replaced an earlier COVID-19 Employer Refund Scheme.

By early April, the Central Statistics Office (CSO) announced that a figure equivalent to more than one tenth of the country's population were unemployed, with nearly 5% of that figure on the Temporary COVID-19 Wage Subsidy Scheme. A spokesman for Goodbody Stockbrokers described it as "unprecedented". By the following week, the numbers receiving income supports had increased by 40% from the previous week's total, though the closing of thousands of applications for the COVID-19 Pandemic Unemployment Payment meant it was "presumed" their employers had rehired them through the Temporary COVID-19 Wage Subsidy Scheme. By mid-May, a figure equivalent to nearly one tenth of the country's population were on the Temporary COVID-19 Wage Subsidy Scheme alone.

On 6 May, Minister for Finance Paschal Donohoe told Morning Ireland that the scheme would continue "in some form" past its original intended date of ending.

On 15 April, Minister for Finance Paschal Donohoe announced changes to the scheme such that the State would pay more money to workers.

On 19 May, Minister for Finance Paschal Donohoe said a decision would be made "soon" regarding an extension of the scheme. On 5 June, Minister for Finance Paschal Donohue announced that the scheme would be extended until the end of August.

Even a State-owned company, RTÉ, sought to participate in the scheme.

Women returning from giving birth were excluded from the scheme; they were advised to apply for social welfare instead.

On 23 July, as part of the July Jobs Stimulus package announced by the Government, the scheme would be replaced by the Employment Wage Support Scheme from September 2020 and would run until April 2021.

== Employment Wage Subsidy Scheme ==
The Employment Wage Subsidy Scheme provided a flat-rate subsidy to qualifying employers whose turnover had fallen 30% based on the numbers of eligible employees on the employer's payroll, including seasonal staff and new employees.

The scheme was announced on 23 July as part of the July Jobs Stimulus package launched by the Government for a seven-month run beginning on 1 September, and replaced the Temporary COVID-19 Wage Subsidy Scheme.

Under the Government's revised Living with COVID-19 plan published on 23 February 2021, the scheme was extended until 30 June 2021.

On 1 June, as part of the Economic Recovery Plan announced by the Government, the scheme was extended until 31 December 2021.

On 12 October, as part of Budget 2022, the scheme was extended until April 2022.

On 31 May 2022, the scheme officially ended for all businesses, after being phased out in March and April.

== See also ==
- List of COVID-19 pandemic legislation
