= COVID-19 Pandemic Unemployment Payment =

Irish government emergency aid program

The COVID-19 Pandemic Unemployment Payment (referred to as the PUP) was a government emergency aid program in the Republic of Ireland that provided monetary relief to those who face unemployment due to the COVID-19 pandemic, whether formerly employed or self-employed.

== Eligibility ==
Anyone whose job vanished on (or after) 13 March 2020 as a result of the pandemic was eligible.

== History ==
On 16 March, Minister for Employment Affairs and Social Protection Regina Doherty announced the COVID-19 Pandemic Unemployment Payment, available for six weeks.

On 24 March, the amount of money distributed as part of the COVID-19 Pandemic Unemployment Payment was increased from €203 per week to €350.

By the end of March, the Department of Employment Affairs and Social Protection announced that the total applications it received for the COVID-19 Pandemic Unemployment Payment over the previous two weeks were equivalent to a 19-month claim load.

Doherty defended the scheme on Today with Seán O'Rourke on 3 April amid claims that some students were taking advantage: "By Jove, I know they're going to spend in it in the economy when we re-open in couple of weeks or a couple of months time. It was a very small price to pay for the people that needed an income".

By early April, the Central Statistics Office (CSO) announced that a figure equivalent to more than one tenth of the country's population were unemployed, with more than half of that number receiving the COVID-19 Pandemic Unemployment Payment. A spokesman for Goodbody Stockbrokers described it as "unprecedented". By the following week, the numbers receiving the COVID-19 Pandemic Unemployment Payment had nearly doubled again from the previous week's total.

In April, the Department of Employment Affairs and Social Protection "inadvertently" emailed 1,700 people to inform them they were no longer eligible for the scheme.

On 6 May, Minister for Finance Paschal Donohoe told Morning Ireland that the payment would continue "in some form" past its original intended date of ending.

On 11 May, it was reported that the number of people receiving the COVID-19 Pandemic Unemployment Payment had slightly decreased for the first time since its establishment, though this was attributed to employees being offered the Temporary COVID-19 Wage Subsidy Scheme instead. A further slight fall occurred the following week.

On 19 May, Minister for Finance Paschal Donohoe said a decision would be made "soon" regarding an extension of the payment. On 4 June, the Government of Ireland announced that the payment would be extended for "months, not weeks". The Irish Independent reported that the payment would be cut by 40% (from €350 to €203 per week) for part-time workers. On 5 June, Minister for Employment Affairs and Social Protection Regina Doherty announced that the payment would be extended until 10 August, and would be reduced for part-time workers from 29 June.

On 21 May, a young male was arrested at a house in Mullingar, County Westmeath, after it was determined that he had applied for six separate COVID-19 Pandemic Unemployment Payments.

On 23 July, as part of the July Jobs Stimulus package announced by the Government, the payment was extended until April 2021 and intended to be gradually reduced to €203 per week over that period based on the pre-pandemic earnings of the claimant. The scheme would, at the time of this announcement, close to new applicants from 17 September.

On 15 September, Minister for Social Protection Heather Humphreys announced that the payment would accept new applicants until the end of the year, with rates going from two different ones to three on 17 September dependent on the amount of money the recipient previously earned.

On 19 October, the Government confirmed that the payment would be restored to €350 for anyone who was earning more than €400 before they lost their job due to COVID-19 restrictions.

On 24 November, Minister for Social Protection Heather Humphreys secured Government approval to keep the payment open to new applicants until 31 March 2021.

Under the Government's new revised Living with COVID-19 plan published on 23 February 2021, the payment was extended until 30 June 2021.

On 1 June, as part of the Economic Recovery Plan announced by the Government, the payment was extended until September 2021, when gradual reductions would begin.

On 30 September, the Comptroller and Auditor General found there were not enough checks carried out by the Department of Social Protection when people applied for the payment in 2020. The report found that 9.4% of claimants were not eligible, in just under half the cases, the claimant continued working while claiming the PUP and in one quarter of cases, there was no evidence the claimant had been working prior to the pandemic.

On 3 December, as part of the Government's reintroduction of measures, the payment was reinstated for all those who lost their jobs as a result of the restrictions.

The payment closed to new applicants on 22 January 2022, and officially ended on 25 March 2022.
