= July Jobs Stimulus =

Economic stimulus program by the Government of Ireland

The July Jobs Stimulus is a €7.4 billion stimulus package announced by the Government of Ireland on 23 July 2020 in response to the economic impact of the COVID-19 pandemic in the Republic of Ireland. The package includes 50 measures to boost economic recovery and get people back to work. The spending primarily includes €115 million for active travel, public transport and renewal of transport infrastructure, €75 million for primary and secondary schools to carry out reconfiguration works necessary to support schools' reopening in late August and September 2020 and €112 million in employment services and supports to deliver 47,500 training and apprenticeship places and a €450 million package of business supports including a €250 million Restart Grant to provide direct grant aid to businesses with up to 250 employees to help them with the costs associated with reopening and reemploying workers.

The COVID-19 Pandemic Unemployment Payment, due to close on 10 August, would be extended until April 2021 and will be gradually reduced to €203 per week over that period based on the pre-pandemic earnings of the claimant as part of the package. From 17 September 2020, the scheme would close to new applications and the headline rate of payment would reduce from €350 to €300. The Temporary COVID-19 Wage Subsidy Scheme would be replaced by the Employment Wage Subsidy Scheme in September 2020, which would run until April 2021.

== Measures ==
The package includes the following measures.

=== Backing Ireland's Businesses ===
- The Employment Wage Subsidy Scheme will succeed the Temporary COVID-19 Wage Subsidy Scheme from September 2020 and will run until April 2021.
- The Restart Grant for businesses will be extended and expanded. The grant will rise from a maximum of €4,000 to €25,000.
- The waiver of commercial rates will be extended until the end of September 2020.
- A €2 billion COVID-19 Credit Guarantee Scheme will be announced.

=== Helping People Get Back to Work ===
- The COVID-19 Pandemic Unemployment Payment will be extended to 1 April 2021.
- €200 million investment in training, skills development, work placement schemes, recruitment subsidies and job search and assistance measures.
- 35,000 extra places will be provided in further and higher education.
- Further supports for apprenticeships.

=== Building Confidence and Investing in Communities ===
- Financial certainty through the Enterprise Wage Support Scheme, Pandemic Unemployment Scheme and Rates Waivers.
- €500 million investment in communities.
- Investment in schools, walking, cycling, public transport, home retrofitting, and town & village renewal. €1,000 allowance to promote expenditure on cycling is being increased to €1,250, and to €1,500 for electric bikes. The period to avail of this is being reduced from every five years to four years.
- Tax measures including a temporary 2% reduction in the standard rate of VAT from 23% to 21% for six months.
- Targeted measures for most vulnerable sectors.

=== Preparing Ireland for the Economy of the Future ===
- €25 million investment in life sciences.
- Training and skills development.
- €10 million to be provided under a new Green Enterprise Fund.
- Increase in Seed and Venture Capital for innovation driving enterprises.
- Additional supports for IDA promotional and marketing initiatives targeting jobs.
- Additional supports to businesses to develop their online presence.
- €20 million Brexit fund to help SMEs to prepare for new customs arrangements.
- Expansion of Sustaining Enterprise Fund scheme.

== Enterprise Support Grant ==
On 14 August, Minister for Social Protection Heather Humphreys opened applications for the newly revamped Enterprise Support Grant, designed to assist people who transitioned from the COVID-19 Pandemic Unemployment Payment into self-employment since 18 May. The Enterprise Support Grant is worth up to €1,000 per person and is aimed at sole traders such as plumbers, electricians, carpenters and taxi drivers, who do not pay commercial rates.

== Stay and Spend Scheme ==
On 3 September, as part of the July Jobs Stimulus, Taoiseach Micheál Martin, Minister for Finance Paschal Donohoe and Minister for Tourism, Culture, Arts, Gaeltacht, Sport and Media Catherine Martin launched the Stay and Spend Scheme to help drive sales in the hospitality sector during the off-season which has been negatively impacted as a result of COVID-19, which will run from 1 October 2020 to 30 April 2021. The scheme provides a maximum of €125 in income tax credits to tax-payers who spend up to €625 in restaurants, pubs, hotels, B&Bs and other qualifying businesses.

== COVID-19 Credit Guarantee Scheme ==
On 7 September, Tánaiste and Minister for Enterprise, Trade and Employment Leo Varadkar, Minister for Finance Paschal Donohoe, Minister for Public Expenditure and Reform Michael McGrath and Minister for Agriculture, Food and the Marine Charlie McConalogue opened the new €2 billion COVID-19 Credit Guarantee Scheme to provide Irish businesses, including those in the farming and fishing sectors, with access to low cost loans as they respond to the impacts of COVID-19. The scheme allows small and medium-sized enterprises to borrow up to €1 million, with 80% of the loan guaranteed by the state. The COVID-19 Credit Guarantee Scheme is the largest state-backed loan guarantee for businesses in the history of Ireland.
