= National Public Health Emergency Team (2020) =

Group within Ireland's Department of Health

The National Public Health Emergency Team for COVID-19 (NPHET) (/ˈnɛfət/; Irish: Foireann Náisiúnta Éigeandála Sláinte Poiblí do COVID-19) was a National Public Health Emergency Team within Ireland's Department of Health that oversaw and provided national direction, support, guidance and expert advice on developing and implementing a strategy to control the coronavirus disease 2019 (COVID-19) pandemic in Ireland.

This NPHET was established on 27 January 2020 in order to deal with the emerging SARS-CoV-2 problem. It was disbanded in February 2022 after the majority of COVID-19 restrictions were removed. A new advisory group was established on 8 April 2022.

== Background ==
NPHET was monitoring the spread of the virus before it was confirmed to have reached Ireland. When established in 2020, it initially had a medium-sized room in the Department of Health. It then moved to a larger room as events developed. Eventually, with the spread of the virus, the daily meetings were conducted remotely using Zoom.

The first known case of COVID-19 to have arrived in Ireland was announced on 27 February 2020, in a woman who had been skiing in Northern Italy and had flown back through Dublin Airport, travelled by bus to Connolly station (Ireland's busiest railway station) before exiting into Northern Ireland by train; her case was confirmed two days later. The first known case of COVID-19 in a resident of the Republic of Ireland was confirmed in the county of Dublin on 29 February 2020, in a secondary school student who had returned from an affected area in Northern Italy.

NPHET continued to meet after the virus had arrived in Ireland to co-ordinate the national response to the pandemic. The team was obliged to operate with an unusual degree of autonomy during the initial months of the pandemic, as the recent general election in February 2020 had left the outgoing government in only a caretaker role.

Chief Medical Officer Dr Tony Holohan chaired NPHET, with the support of six deputy chief medical officers. Meetings tended to start with an epidemiology report on the latest viral developments in Ireland. Holohan asks for the perspectives of public health doctors. Two letters were drafted at the end of each meeting, one for the Taoiseach and the other for the Minister for Health. In addition, before each meeting, Holohan gave its agenda to the Minister for Health in a call and queried if the government had anything specific they wish to have discussed. Holohan temporarily stepped down as chief medical officer on 2 July 2020 for family reasons; Deputy Chief Medical Officer Ronan Glynn was subsequently appointed Acting Chief Medical Officer. Holohan returned in October 2020.

NPHET used press briefings to communicate updates, guidelines, statistics and policy changes to the public during the COVID-19 pandemic in Ireland.

After it emerged that the agenda and meeting notes of NPHET had not been published since the end of March 2020, and following calls in Dáil Éireann for be rectified, minutes were subsequently published at the end of April. Shortly before this, NPHET published details of its governance structure.

== Members ==
Members were from the Department of Health, HSE, HIQA, HPSC, ICGP and HPRA, as well as consultants, epidemiologists and the Coronavirus Expert Advisory Group and the Irish Epidemiological Modelling Advisory Group. Three new members were appointed to the National Public Health Emergency Team on 6 January 2021.

Member	Role
Tony Holohan	Chief Medical Officer, Chair of NPHET
Ronan Glynn	Deputy Chief Medical Officers of the Department of Health
Heather Burns	Deputy Chief Medical Officers of the Department of Health
Desmond Hickey	Deputy Chief Medical Officers of the Department of Health
Eibhlin Connolly	Deputy Chief Medical Officers of the Department of Health
Alan Smith	Deputy Chief Medical Officers of the Department of Health
Colette Bonner	Deputy Chief Medical Officers of the Department of Health
Paul Bolger	Director of the Department of Health Resources Division
Colm Bergin	Consultant Infectious Diseases, St. James's Hospital and Professor of Medicine, Trinity College Dublin
Tracey Conroy	Acute Hospitals Division of the Department of Health
John Cuddihy	Interim Director of the Health Protection Surveillance Centre (HPSC)
Cillian de Gascun	Director of the National Virus Reference Laboratory, Chair of the Coronavirus Expert Advisory Group
Colm Desmond	Corporate Legislation, Mental Health, Drugs Policy and Food Safety Division of the Department of Health
Colm Henry	Chief Clinical Officer of the Health Service Executive (HSE)
Lorraine Doherty	National Clinical Director for Health Protection of the HPSC and HSE
Mary Favier	President of the Irish College of General Practitioners (ICGP)
Fergal Goodman	Primary Care Division of the Department of Health
Kevin Kelleher	Assistant National Director of the HSE
Marita Kinsella	Director of the National Patient Safety Office at the Department of Health
Kathleen Mac Lellan	Social Care Division of the Department of Health
Jeanette Mc Callion	Medical Assessor of the Health Products Regulatory Authority (HPRA)
Tom McGuinness	Assistant National Director at the Office of Emergency Planning at the HSE
Siobhán Ní Bhrian	Lead for Integrated Care of the HSE
Philip Nolan	President of Maynooth University
Kate O'Flaherty	Head of Health and Wellbeing at the Department of Health
Darina O'Flanagan	Special Advisor to NPHET and the Department of Health
Siobhan O'Sullivan	Chief Bioethics Officer of the Department of Health
Michael Power	National Clinical Lead, Critical Care Programme, HSE Consultant in Anaesthetics and Intensive Care Medicine at Beaumont Hospital, Dublin
Phelim Quinn	Chief Executive Officer of the Health Information and Quality Authority (HIQA)
Máirín Ryan	Deputy Chief Executive and Director of Health Technology Assessment of HIQA
Breda Smyth	Director of Public Health Medicine of the HSE
Deirdre Watters	Head of Communications of the Department of Health
Liam Woods	National Director of Acute Operations of the HSE
David Walsh	National Director of Community Operations of the HSE
David Leach	Deputy National Director of Communications of the HSE
Mary Horgan	President of the Royal College of Physicians of Ireland
Karina Butler	Chair of the National Immunisation Advisory Committee (NIAC)
Fidelma Browne	Head of Programmes and Campaigns, Communications of the HSE
Mark Ferguson	Director General of Science Foundation Ireland and Government Chief Scientific Advisor

== Subgroups ==
=== Coronavirus Expert Advisory Group ===
The Coronavirus Expert Advisory Group was a subgroup of NPHET.

It was chaired by Cillian de Gascun, the UCD-based Director of the National Virus Reference Laboratory.

The Coronavirus Expert Advisory Group met for the first time on 5 February 2020 in Dublin.

=== Acute Hospital Preparedness Subgroup ===
The Acute Hospital Preparedness Subgroup was formed on 3 March 2020 and met for the first time on 4 March 2020. It provided assurance on the preparedness of the acute hospital system to tackle significant increases in hospital admissions, and that plans for preparedness are being implemented across the public hospital system.

It was chaired by Tracey Conroy, Assistant Secretary, Acute Hospitals Policy Division at the Department of Health.

=== Behavioural Change Subgroup ===
The Behavioural Change Subgroup was formed on 18 March and was made up of nine members. It was set up to provide insights and evidence to support the communications strategy and the wider work of NPHET.

It was chaired by Kate O'Flaherty, Head of Health and Wellbeing at the Department of Health.

=== Guidance and Evidence Synthesis Subgroup ===
The Guidance and Evidence Synthesis Subgroup was formed to facilitate information exchange on the public health and clinical guidance relating to COVID-19. The subgroup provided assurance to NPHET on coordination of surge evidence synthesis capacity to support the development of guidance.

It was chaired by Máirín Ryan, Deputy Chief Executive and Director of Health Technology Assessment at HIQA.

== Modelling group ==
=== Irish Epidemiological Modelling Advisory Group ===
The Irish Epidemiological Modelling Advisory Group (IEMAG) was a modelling group of NPHET formed on 11 March 2020 to provide statistical support and advice to NPHET and the Chief Medical Officer. Staff at University College Dublin, University of Limerick and other mathematical researchers in Ireland were involved in developing mathematical models for stages of the COVID-19 pandemic.

It was chaired by Philip Nolan, the former president of Maynooth University.

== Disbandment ==
Following speculation that NPHET would be disbanded from mid-October 2021, Taoiseach Micheál Martin confirmed that the team would cease to exist as a separate body over time and that their role and the COVID-19 vaccination taskforce would be transitioned into the normal functions of the Department of Health and the HSE, after the Government published a plan for easing most COVID-19 restrictions by 22 October. As a result of rising COVID-19 cases due to a fifth wave of COVID-19 caused by the Omicron variant, and after almost all restrictions were eased eventually in early January 2022, there were no plans for NPHET to be disbanded.

On 17 February 2022, Chief Medical Officer Tony Holohan proposed in a letter to the Minister for Health Stephen Donnelly that the NPHET be disbanded and replaced with a smaller monitoring group. It was confirmed on 22 February that the NPHET would be disbanded, but the Office of the Chief Medical Officer would continue to monitor the epidemiological profile of COVID-19.

A new COVID-19 advisory group was established on 8 April 2022.

== See also ==
- White House Coronavirus Task Force
- White House COVID-19 Response Team
- National Public Health Emergency Team
