= Timeline of the COVID-19 pandemic in the Republic of Ireland (2021) =

Daily events related to the COVID-19 pandemic in the Republic of Ireland in 2021

The following is a timeline of the COVID-19 pandemic in the Republic of Ireland in 2021.

== Timeline ==
=== January 2021 ===
- 2 January
  - A further 3,394 cases and 4 deaths were reported, bringing the totals to 96,926 cases and 2,252 deaths.
  - It was revealed that there were approximately 9,000 positive COVID-19 tests not yet logged on the HSE's IT systems, due to both limitations in the software; and lack of staff to check and input details, meaning there was an effective ceiling of approximately 1,700 to 2,000 cases that could be logged each day.
  - The Director of the National Virus Reference Laboratory Cillian de Gascun announced that a further nine cases of the UK variant of COVID-19 had been detected in the Republic of Ireland from 23 December to 29 December, bringing the total number of cases identified to 16.
- 6 January
  - A further 7,836 cases and 17 deaths were reported, bringing the totals to 121,154 cases and 2,299 deaths. 4 previously notified cases were de-notified.
  - The Government agreed a number of new lockdown measures including the closure of all schools until February with Leaving Certificate students allowed to attend school for three days a week, the closure of all non-essential construction sites with certain exceptions, the requirement for all passengers from the United Kingdom and South Africa to have a negative PCR test and the prohibition of click-and-collect services for non-essential retail.
  - It was announced that Minister for Justice Helen McEntee tested positive for COVID-19.
- 7 January
  - The government was forced to abandon plans for Leaving Certificate students to attend school on three days a week, and instead students would return to homeschooling until February, after the ASTI directed its members not to return to in-school teaching.
  - The rollout of the Pfizer–BioNTech COVID-19 vaccine in private and voluntary nursing homes began nationwide, with 22 nursing homes of 3,000 residents and staff to be vaccinated.
- 8 January
  - A further 8,248 cases and 20 deaths were reported, bringing the totals to 135,884 cases and 2,327 deaths. 21 previously notified cases were de-notified.
  - In a statement from NPHET, Chief Medical Officer Tony Holohan confirmed that three cases of the South African variant of COVID-19 had been detected in the country by whole genome sequencing associated with travel from South Africa.
- 11 January
  - Figures revealed by the Our World in Data organisation showed that Ireland had the highest daily number of new confirmed COVID-19 cases in the world for every million people.
  - Gardaí received new COVID-19 enforcement powers, including the power to fine people €100 in breach in the 5 km travel limit.
- 12 January
  - The government agreed that all passengers arriving into Ireland would need a negative PCR COVID-19 test taken 72 hours before departure from Saturday 16 January.
  - The first shipment of the Moderna vaccine arrived in the Republic of Ireland.
- 15 January – The Chief Medical Officers of Ireland and Northern Ireland Tony Holohan and Michael McBride issued a joint statement urging everyone to stay at home.
- 17 January – The government requested early deliveries of the Oxford–AstraZeneca COVID-19 vaccine as discussions to secure early delivery of the vaccine got underway.
- 18 January – The number of patients with COVID-19 being treated in hospitals around the country reached a record 2,023, with 200 in ICUs and over 400 people receiving high-grade ventilation and respiratory support.
- 19 January – The government was forced to abandon plans to reopen special schools on 21 January for thousands of children with special educational needs following safety concerns among staff unions.
- 20 January – The St Patrick's Day parade in Dublin was cancelled for a second year.
- 22 January – Chief Clinical Officer of the HSE Colm Henry stated that COVID-19 transmission levels remained too high for schools to reopen in February.
- 26 January – The government announced the extension of the Level 5 lockdown restrictions until 5 March, along with a number of new measures including a mandatory 14-day quarantine period for all people travelling into the country without a negative COVID-19 test.
- 30 January – Chief Medical Officer Tony Holohan announced that more cases had been confirmed in one month than throughout 2020 with over 1,000 deaths and more than 100,000 cases confirmed in January.
- 31 January – A further 1,247 cases and 15 deaths were reported, bringing the totals to 196,547 cases and 3,307 deaths. 3 previously notified cases were de-notified.

=== February 2021 ===
- 1 February – The Department of Education agreed to reopen special schools with 50% capacity on 11 February and special classes in mainstream schools on 22 February.
- 3 February – The Department of Public Health expressed concern over increases in COVID-19 transmission linked to social gatherings involving the student population in the mid-west region.
- 4 February – The total number of COVID-19 cases in Ireland surpassed 200,000 cases, with over half confirmed in 2021.
- 6 February – The first shipment of 21,600 AstraZeneca vaccines arrived in the Republic of Ireland.
- 10 February – The World Health Organization praised Ireland's recovery from the third wave of COVID-19 but warned of the danger of a fourth wave.
- 11 February – The ASTI withdrew from discussions with the Department of Education on the Leaving Certificate 2021 after it said that the plan being developed would not provide a "meaningful Leaving Certificate" for students.
- 12 February – It was confirmed that the traditional St Patrick's Day meeting between US President Joe Biden and Taoiseach Micheál Martin at the White House would take place virtually due to the COVID-19 pandemic.
- 13 February – The ASTI re-joined discussions with the Department of Education on the Leaving Certificate 2021 after pulling out on 11 February.
- 15 February – Minister for Health Stephen Donnelly confirmed locations for 37 vaccination centres across all counties as part of the country's COVID-19 vaccination programme.
- 17 February
  - Ireland's COVID-19 death toll surpassed 4,000 as Deputy Chief Medical Officer Ronan Glynn announced that 90% of COVID-19 cases in Ireland were the UK variant of COVID-19.
  - Minister for Education Norma Foley confirmed that Leaving Certificate examinations would proceed with students given the option between a modified version of calculated grades or written exams, while Junior Certificate examinations were cancelled for a second year in a row.
- 19 February – Taoiseach Micheál Martin expressed his condolences to Chief Medical Officer Tony Holohan and his family after his wife, Emer, died following a long illness with multiple myeloma.
- 22 February – Special classes in mainstream primary and secondary schools reopened as the phased reopening of schools continued.
- 23 February – Taoiseach Micheál Martin announced the extension of Level 5 lockdown restrictions for another six weeks until 5 April at the earliest as the government published its new revised Living with COVID-19 plan called "The Path Ahead", which included the phased reopening of schools and childcare and the extension of the COVID-19 Pandemic Unemployment Payment and the Employment Wage Subsidy Scheme.

==== COVID-19 Resilience and Recovery 2021 – The Path Ahead ====
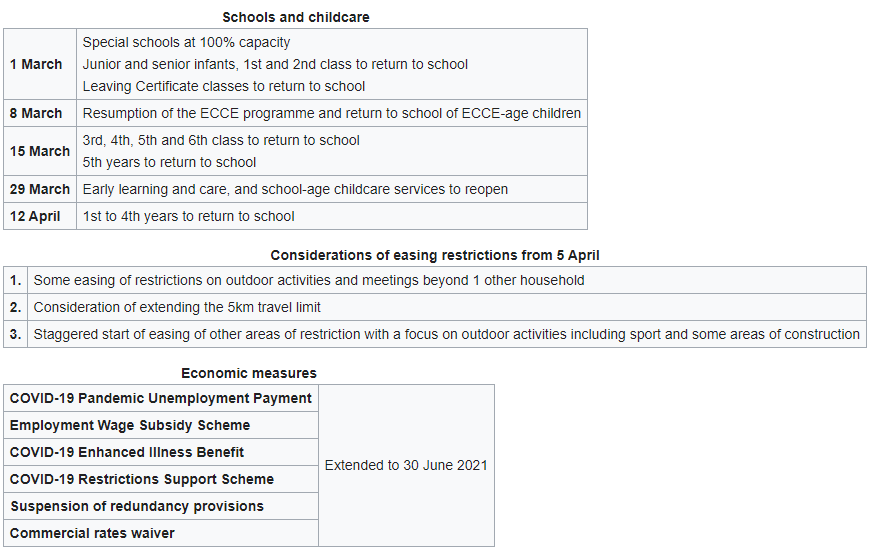

- 27 February – 23 people were arrested and 3 Gardaí were injured (including one hospitalised), as around 500 protesters took part in an anti-lockdown protest in Dublin city centre, with fireworks being fired at Gardaí, while St Stephen's Green and the Iveagh Gardens closed in advance of the protest. The protest was widely condemned by the gardaí and politicians, including the Taoiseach, Tánaiste and Minister for Justice.
- 28 February
  - A further 612 cases and 6 deaths were reported, bringing the totals to 219,592 cases and 4,319 deaths.
  - Ireland officially marked one year since the first case of COVID-19 in the country was confirmed on 29 February 2020.
  - 13 people, including 12 men and 1 woman, were charged and remanded in custody for public order offences after anti-lockdown protests in Dublin city centre turned violent on 27 February, while Tánaiste Leo Varadkar stated that the violence on the streets of Dublin was "not a protest and was a riot".

=== March 2021 ===
- 1 March – Over 320,000 junior primary school pupils and Leaving Certificate students nationwide returned to school for the first time since Christmas.
- 2 March – A man in his 30s was arrested in connection with a firework attack on Gardaí at a violent anti-lockdown protest in Dublin city centre on 27 February.
- 3 March – Jake Merriman, a 30-year-old man, appeared in court charged in connection with a firework attack on Gardaí at an anti-lockdown protest in Dublin city centre on 27 February.
- 6 March
  - Taoiseach Micheál Martin announced that Ireland had reached the milestone of half a million COVID-19 vaccines administered.
  - Gardaí arrested 6 people (5 men and 1 woman) as around 450 people attended an anti-lockdown protest in Cork city centre that ended without incident.
- 7 March – President Michael D. Higgins signed into law the legislation to bring in mandatory hotel quarantine for certain passengers entering the country from high-risk countries.
- 11 March – Ireland officially marked one year since the first death of COVID-19 in the country was confirmed on 11 March 2020, the same day when COVID-19 was declared a pandemic.
- 14 March – The administration of the AstraZeneca COVID-19 vaccine was suspended in Ireland by the National Immunisation Advisory Committee (NIAC) as a precautionary measure following concerns over serious blood clots in Norway.
- 15 March – Over 350,000 remaining primary school pupils and fifth year secondary students nationwide returned to school for the first time since Christmas.
- 16 March – The Garda Síochána urged people to stay at home for St Patrick's Day as a significant policing operation was put in place to deal with planned protests in Dublin city with 2,500 Gardaí being deployed across the country.
- 17 March – Gardaí arrested 21 people after around 700 protestors took part in a number of anti-lockdown protests in Dublin city centre, Herbert Park and at the RTÉ campus in Donnybrook.
- 18 March – It was confirmed that 7 Gardaí were injured (including five hospitalised) after being kicked, punched and spat at in separate violent anti-lockdown protests which took place in Dublin on St Patrick's Day.
- 19 March – The NIAC recommended that the AstraZeneca COVID-19 vaccine could continue to be used in Ireland following approval from the European Medicines Agency (EMA) on 18 March.
- 23 March – The booking portal for mandatory hotel quarantine in Ireland opened for those arriving into the country from Friday 26 March, with a 12-night stay for passengers arriving from high risk countries costing €1,875 each.
- 26 March
  - Ireland's mandatory hotel quarantine system for all passengers arriving into the country from high-risk countries came into force at 4 am.
  - The Leader of the Labour Party Alan Kelly called for the chief executive of the Beacon Hospital to resign after it gave 20 leftover COVID-19 vaccines to a number of teachers and staff at a private secondary school in Bray, County Wicklow on 23 March.
- 27 March – Gardaí began an investigation after three people absconded from a mandatory hotel quarantine facility near Dublin Airport while on a smoking break outside under supervision, with one person located.
- 28 March – A second person who absconded from a mandatory hotel quarantine facility on 27 March was located, while a search for the third male continued.
- 30 March – The government announced a phased easing of Level 5 restrictions from 12 April, with people allowed to travel within their county, two households allowed to meet socially outdoors, fully vaccinated people allowed to meet other vaccinated people indoors, and the resumption of all residential construction projects from that date.
  - From 19 April:
    - Elite-level senior GAA matches and training could resume
  - From 26 April:
    - Outdoor sports facilities (such as pitches, golf courses and tennis courts) could reopen
    - Outdoor visitor attractions (such as zoos, open pet farms, heritage sites) could reopen
    - Maximum attendance at funerals would increase from 10 to 25 on compassionate grounds
  - From 4 May:
    - Full reopening of construction activity
    - Phased reopening of non-essential retail and personal services
    - Religious services, museums and galleries could reopen and resume
- 31 March – A further 411 cases and 6 deaths were reported, bringing the totals to 235,854 cases and 4,687 deaths. 1 previously notified case was de-notified.

=== April 2021 ===
- 2 April – Two women in their 30s were arrested and charged after refusing to enter mandatory hotel quarantine upon arrival in Dublin Airport from Dubai.
- 6 April – Three women who absconded from a mandatory hotel quarantine facility in Dublin were found by Gardaí almost 200 km away near Loughrea, County Galway.
- 7 April – The three teacher unions voted for an emergency motion backing industrial action, up to and including strike action, if they were not prioritised for vaccination.
- 8 April – The Health Products Regulatory Authority (HPRA) began an investigation after the first case of a very rare blood clot in the brain of a person after vaccination with the AstraZeneca vaccine was confirmed in a 40-year-old Dublin woman.
- 12 April
  - The phased easing of Level 5 restrictions began with the 5 km travel limit lifted, the resumption of all residential construction work, two households could meet up outdoors and the full reopening of all schools.
  - Following a lengthy meeting, the NIAC recommend that only people over 60 years of age should get the AstraZeneca COVID-19 vaccine and that a second dose of the vaccine should not be given to anyone who developed unusual blood clots with low platelets after the first dose.
- 15 April – Over 26,000 people registered for a COVID-19 vaccination after the online portal for 69-year-olds went live.
- 16 April – The European Commission urged the government to amend or possibly scrap mandatory hotel quarantine for EU citizens and sought clarifications as to why a number of EU member states were subject to the rules.
- 23 April – The Health Products Regulatory Authority reported a number of serious blood clotting events associated with the AstraZeneca vaccine in people who received the vaccine.
- 26 April – The further easing of Level 5 restrictions came into effect with all sports pitches, golf courses, tennis courts, zoos, pet farms and heritage sites reopening.
- 29 April – The government announced a reopening plan for the country throughout May and June from 10 May, with inter-county travel allowed, the reopening of all hairdressers, libraries, museums and galleries, up to 50 people allowed to attend religious services, the resumption of click-and-collect services and the allowances of three households to meet outdoors (including in private gardens) and a vaccinated household to meet an unvaccinated household indoors from that date.
  - From 17 May
    - All retail could reopen
  - From 2 June
    - Hotels, B&Bs, self-catering and hostels could reopen but services must be restricted to overnight guests and residents
  - From 7 June
    - Outdoor sports matches could recommence with no spectators permitted
    - Gyms, swimming pools and leisure centres could reopen for individual training only
    - Outdoor services in restaurants and bars could recommence, with groups limited to a maximum of 6 people
    - The numbers of guests attending wedding celebrations/receptions could increase to 25
    - Visitors from one other household could be permitted in private homes
- 30 April
  - A further 545 cases and 4 deaths were reported, bringing the totals to 248,870 cases and 4,903 deaths. 1 previously notified case was de-notified.
  - Minister for Health Stephen Donnelly announced that nearly 150 cases of variants of concern had been identified in Ireland, including: 71 cases of the South African variant, 27 cases of the Brazilian variant, 8 cases of the Indian variant, 6 cases of the New York variant and 20 cases of the Nigerian variant.

=== May 2021 ===
- 3 May – In an open letter to those who had been fully vaccinated, Chief Medical Officer Tony Holohan praised the sacrifices people had made over the past year and advised those who were vaccinated to make the most of socialising outdoors.
- 4 May – The COVID-19 vaccine registration portal opened to people aged between 50 and 59 on a phased basis, starting with people aged 59.
- 6 May – The first doses of the Janssen COVID-19 vaccine were administered through homeless services at a temporary vaccination clinic set up in Dublin.
- 10 May – The further easing of Level 5 restrictions came into effect with all hairdressers, barbers, beauticians, galleries, museums, libraries and other cultural attractions reopening, the resumption of non-essential retail on a phased basis, inter-county travel and in-person religious services, and the allowance of three households (or six people) from individual households to meet outdoors.
- 14 May – The HSE shut down all of its IT systems after a major ransomware attack, with Ireland's GP and Close Contact referral system and the COVID-19 vaccine registration portal down, while the COVID-19 vaccination programme had not been affected by the attack.
- 15 May – The HSE stated that there was "substantial cancellations across all outpatient services with widespread cancellation of radiology services" following a ransomware attack on its IT systems.
- 16 May – The Department of Health confirmed that it had been the victim of a separate cyber attack similar to the ransomware attack on the Health Service Executive, prompting the shutting down of much of its IT infrastructure.
- 17 May – The further easing of Level 5 restrictions came into effect with the reopening of all non-essential retail for the first time in over four months.
- 19 May – The COVID-19 vaccine registration portal opened to people aged between 45 and 49 on a phased basis, starting with people aged 49.
- 27 May – The Chief Executive of the HSE Paul Reid stated that the cost of the cyber attack on its IT systems could exceed €100 million.
- 28 May
  - The HSE confirmed that data relating to 520 patients, including sensitive information, was published online following the ransomware attack on 14 May.
  - The government announced a further reopening plan for the country throughout June, July and August, with the reopening of all hotels from 2 June, outdoor hospitality, cinemas, swimming pools, gyms from 7 June, and indoor hospitality from 5 July.
  - From 2 June:
    - Reopening of accommodation services including hotels, B&Bs, self-catering and hostels
  - From 7 June:
    - The numbers permitted at organised outdoor events could increase to a maximum of 100 for the majority of venues, with a maximum of 200 for outdoor venues with a minimum accredited capacity of 5,000
    - Reopening of all cinemas, theatres, gyms, swimming pools and leisure centres
    - Reopening of outdoor amusement parks, theme parks and funfairs
    - Resumption of outdoor services in restaurants and pubs
    - Visiting indoors in private homes
    - Partial reopening of Driver Theory Test Services
    - Resumption of outdoor sports matches
  - From 5 July:
    - Up to three households permitted to meet indoors in private homes in line with Level 2
    - Resumption of organised indoor events
    - The numbers permitted at outdoor organised events could further increase to a maximum of 200 for the majority of venues, with a maximum of 500 for outdoor stadia/venues with a minimum accredited capacity of 5,000
    - Resumption of indoor services in restaurants and pubs
    - Reopening of bowling alleys, snooker halls, amusement arcades, ice-skating/roller skating rinks and indoor waterparks
  - From 19 July:
    - International non-essential travel would be allowed with the EU Digital COVID Certificate for travel coming into force in Ireland
- 31 May – A further 378 cases were reported, however data relating to the number of COVID-19 deaths and total number of cases were not available due to the HSE cyberattack.

=== June 2021 ===
- 1 June – The government launched a €3.5 billion Economic Recovery Plan to achieve rapid job creation and economic growth after the pandemic, with the COVID-19 Pandemic Unemployment Payment and the Employment Wage Subsidy Scheme extended until September 2021, when gradual reductions would begin.
- 2 June – The COVID-19 vaccine registration portal opened to people aged between 40 and 44 on a phased basis, starting with people aged 44.
- 4 June – Minister of State with responsibility for the Office of Public Works Patrick O'Donovan appealed to people visiting St Stephen's Green in Dublin to respect the site after reckless behaviour was witnessed on 3 June when a group of people gained access to the bandstand which had been fenced off for health and safety reasons.
- 5 June – 14 people (including 5 juveniles) were arrested for public order offences and a Garda received hospital treatment on the night of 4 June, after violence broke out in Dublin city centre in which glass bottles were thrown at Gardaí, which resulted in a patrol car being damaged. Minister for Health Stephen Donnelly described the incidents as "thuggish behaviour and completely unacceptable".
- 6 June – 19 people (including 2 juveniles) were arrested for public order offences and two Gardaí received hospital treatment on the night of 5 June, after violence broke out in Dublin's south city centre for a second consecutive night in which a person was assaulted, a bin was set on fire and glass bottles were thrown, which resulted in a patrol car being damaged.
- 7 June
  - The gradual easing of COVID-19 restrictions continued with the reopening of all bars, restaurants and cafés for outdoor service, gyms, swimming pools, leisure centres, cinemas and theatres, the partial resumption of driver theory test services, and the allowance of an unvaccinated household to visit another unvaccinated household indoors.
  - 14 people (including 3 juveniles) were arrested for public order offences on the night of 6 June, after violence broke out in Dublin's south city centre for a third consecutive night, while Gardaí arrested 8 people in Cork.
- 10 June – The first in a series of live pilot concerts took place at the Iveagh Gardens, Dublin, with James Vincent McMorrow and special guest Sorcha Richardson playing to 500 people at the show.
- 15 June – The government agreed to increase the self-isolation period for travellers arriving in Ireland from Britain from 5 to 10 days for those who are not fully vaccinated amid Delta variant concerns.
- 20 June – The COVID-19 vaccine registration portal opened to people aged between 35 and 39 on a phased basis, starting with people aged 39.
- 21 June – Chief Medical Officer Tony Holohan stated that the latest data showed a "concerning increase in transmission" of the Delta variant of COVID-19 in Ireland.
- 23 June – It was confirmed that at least three quarters of the HSE's IT servers had been decrypted and 70% of computer devices were back in use, following the cyber attack in May.
- 29 June – Due to the rapidly increasing incidence of the Delta variant, the government announced that the planned reopening of indoor dining and drinking in restaurants and pubs on 5 July would be delayed until at least 19 July when a system to verify vaccination or immunity would be implemented, while 50 guests would be permitted to attend wedding celebrations as an exception from July.
- 30 June – A further 452 cases and 9 deaths were reported, bringing the totals to 272,336 cases and 4,998 deaths.

=== July 2021 ===
- 1 July – Chief Medical Officer Tony Holohan announced that a fourth wave of COVID-19 was beginning in Ireland following an increase in cases caused by the Delta variant.
- 2 July – The government agreed a deal to purchase one million unwanted COVID-19 vaccine doses from Romania.
- 3 July
  - More than 300 protestors took part in an anti-lockdown protest in Dublin city centre.
  - Over 3,500 people attended a pilot music festival featuring Gavin James, Denise Chaila and Sharon Shannon in Dublin, with antigen testing used for entry.
- 5 July
  - In a statement, Chief Medical Officer Tony Holohan stated that more than 70% of all cases were now accounted for by the Delta variant, as it continued to present a risk to those who were unvaccinated or waiting for a second dose of vaccine.
  - Over 500 pharmacies around the country began administering the Janssen COVID-19 vaccine to people aged 18 to 34 who opted-in to receive it.
- 7 July – The COVID-19 vaccine registration portal opened to people aged between 30 and 34 on a phased basis, starting with people aged 34.
- 12 July
  - Fully vaccinated people began receiving their EU Digital COVID Certificates via email or post.
  - The government approved legislation for the resumption of indoor hospitality, with proofs of vaccination needed for those who were vaccinated or recovered from COVID-19, while those under 18 would be required to be accompanied by a fully vaccinated person.
- 15 July – Hundreds of people gathered outside the Convention Centre in Dublin on the night of 14 July to protest against the Government's response to the COVID-19 pandemic after the Dáil passed legislation to allow for the reopening of indoor dining.
- 16 July – The COVID-19 vaccine registration portal opened to people aged between 25 and 29 on a phased basis, starting with people aged 29.
- 19 July
  - The COVID-19 vaccine registration portal opened to people aged between 18 and 24 for the AstraZeneca vaccine on a phased basis, starting with people aged 24.
  - Ireland joined the rest of the EU in implementing the Digital COVID Certificate as travel restrictions into and out of the country eased.
- 21 July
  - The government agreed that indoor dining in pubs and restaurants could resume on Monday 26 July for fully vaccinated and COVID-19 recovered people, after President Michael D. Higgins signed the legislation underpinning new guidelines into law.
  - The COVID-19 vaccine registration portal opened to people aged 18 or over for the Pfizer or Moderna vaccines.
- 22 July – Deputy Chief Medical Officer Ronan Glynn stated that the number of COVID-19 cases related to overseas travel had increased "very sharply", after it was revealed that the Delta variant now accounted for 90% of cases in Ireland.
- 23 July – Following lengthy discussions, draft guidelines for the reopening of bars and restaurants indoors on Monday 26 July were published. Under the guidelines, the EU Digital COVID Certificate (DCC) would be the primary evidence for proof of immunity, all customers would have to show photo ID and contact tracing details for all customers would have to be taken, with an online QR code scanner developed to verify people's DCCs.
- 24 July – Around 1,500 protestors gathered in Dublin city centre to protest against vaccines, new legislation allowing for the reopening of indoor dining and the Digital COVID Certificate.
- 26 July – Restaurants, cafés and bars reopened for indoor dining and drinking for the first time since December 2020, operating under strict new public health regulations.
- 27 July – After the COVID-19 vaccine registration portal opened to people aged 16 and 17 for the Pfizer or Moderna vaccines, the government agreed to extend the COVID-19 vaccination programme to those aged 12 to 15 and to increase the limit of number of guests permitted at weddings from 50 to 100 from 5 August.
- 31 July
  - A further 1,427 cases were reported, bringing the total number of confirmed cases to 300,976.
  - Taoiseach Micheál Martin announced that Ireland had more adults fully vaccinated than the UK, with 72.4% of adults in Ireland fully vaccinated compared to 72.1% in the UK.

=== August 2021 ===
- 4 August – Political pressure was mounting on former Minister for Children Katherine Zappone, who was appointed UN special envoy on freedom of expression, after she organised an outdoor 50-person event at the Merrion Hotel in Dublin on 21 July and stated that she was "assured" by the hotel that the event was "in compliance with Government COVID-19 restrictions and guidelines". Zappone ultimately declined her UN role after the appointment process was criticised.
- 5 August – A video emerged online appearing to show multiple breaches of COVID-19 regulations at the pub owned by Independent TD Danny Healy-Rae in Kilgarvan, County Kerry, with young people gathering in the pub wearing no masks, with no social distancing and with access to the bar.
- 6 August
  - In the wake of the Merrion Hotel controversy, Fáilte Ireland updated its hospitality guidelines to allow customers book multiple tables and host outdoor gatherings with live music for up to 200 people.
  - Following a meeting of the Cabinet COVID-19 sub-committee, it was announced that the Government would publish a roadmap by the end of August for the easing or ending of remaining COVID-19 restrictions.
- 11 August – The COVID-19 vaccine registration portal opened to people aged 12 to 15 for the Pfizer or Moderna vaccines.
- 17 August – Ahead of the All-Ireland Senior Hurling Championship Final between Limerick and Cork on Sunday 22 August, Public Health Mid-West, Limerick City and County Council, Limerick GAA and Gardaí urged people to limit their post-match social activity and to abide by the public health guidelines, because of the high rate of COVID-19 incidence in the county.
- 19 August – Following a meeting of the Government Committee on COVID-19, it was revealed that a roadmap for the phased reopening of all remaining closed industries, including the live entertainment and arts sector, would be published on 31 August.
- 22 August – HSE CEO Paul Reid said the threat from COVID-19 was still "very real", with the number of patients being treated in hospitals with COVID-19 at its highest level since the end of March, increasing to 314.
- 23 August
  - Following crowds of people gathering after the 2021 All-Ireland Senior Hurling Championship Final on 22 August, Gardaí began investigating alleged breaches of COVID-19 regulations at a pub near Croke Park, while several pubs were temporarily shut by Gardaí due to anti-social behaviour and a lack of social distancing.
  - Music industry representatives criticised the Government after 40,000 people were allowed to attend the All-Ireland Senior Hurling Final at Croke Park, while the live entertainment industry remained closed, with representatives from a number of live event and music industry groups stating that the Taoiseach and Foreign Affairs Minister's attendance at the final was a "blatant disregard" for the live events industry.
- 24 August
  - Minister for Health Stephen Donnelly said the Government would continue to ease COVID-19 restrictions "as quickly as possible" and that all remaining COVID-19 restrictions would be eased before Christmas.
  - Chief Medical Officer Tony Holohan warned of an "extremely high incidence" of the disease in Ireland and that mask wearing in public places had decreased, while the Chair of the NPHET Irish Epidemiological Modelling Advisory Group Philip Nolan said the peak of the fourth wave could be reached in September.
- 31 August
  - A further 1,382 cases were reported, bringing the total number of confirmed cases to 352,447.
  - The government announced a further reopening plan for the country, with all remaining COVID-19 restrictions to be eased by 22 October, including the two-metre social distancing rule depending on the requirement of individual sectors, while masks would still be required in the health and retail sectors and on public transport.
  - From 1 September:
    - Public transport would be operating at 100% full capacity, with the requirement to wear masks remaining
  - From 6 September:
    - Larger crowds could gather for religious ceremonies with up to 50% capacity allowed in places of worship
    - Outdoor sports events could have 50% capacity in stadiums
    - Indoor venues could operate at 60% capacity for events for those who are vaccinated, while outdoor events could operate at 75% capacity for those who are vaccinated
    - Resumption of live music indoors at weddings and in bars
  - From 20 September:
    - The phased return to the workplace would commence
    - Resumption of indoor after-school activities along with sports indoors
  - From 22 October:
    - Easing of the remaining COVID-19 restrictions depending on COVID-19 cases remaining manageable and 90% of adults being fully vaccinated, including the easing of requirements on social distancing and mask wearing

=== September 2021 ===
- 1 September – Public transport began operating at 100% capacity across the country, as the Government's plan for easing most COVID-19 restrictions by 22 October began, while the GAA announced that an additional 1,150 tickets would be available, with 41,150 people allowed to attend the All-Ireland football final on 11 September.
- 3 September – According to the European Centre for Disease Control, Ireland had the highest incidence of COVID-19 in the EU, which put the country firmly in the red zone as hospitalisations rise.
- 5 September – Tánaiste Leo Varadkar faced criticism after a photograph emerged on social media showing him at the Mighty Hoopla music festival in London on the same weekend Electric Picnic was cancelled in Ireland due to the Government's COVID-19 restrictions.
- 6 September – Organised indoor and outdoor events and mass gatherings returned and live music and dancing were permitted at weddings, as the further easing of COVID-19 restrictions took place.
- 9 September – Ahead of the All-Ireland Senior Football Championship Final between Tyrone and Mayo on Saturday 11 September, Public Health West, Mayo County Council, Mayo GAA and Gardaí urged people to exercise extreme caution to prevent gatherings from turning into super spreader events.
- 10 September – Latest figures showed that 90% of adults in Ireland were fully vaccinated against COVID-19, while the seven-millionth dose was administered.
- 14 September – Chief Medical Officer Tony Holohan warned that new COVID-19 restrictions could not be ruled out and "may be required in the future", despite very high levels of COVID-19 vaccine uptake.
- 19 September – Latest figures showed that over 90% of Irish people over the age of 16 were now fully vaccinated against COVID-19, the highest rate in the European Union.
- 20 September – Thousands of workers across the country began returning to their offices and places of work, as COVID-19 restrictions further eased with rules around organised indoor group activities being relaxed and limits on outdoor group activities for participants being removed.
- 24 September – The HSE announced that immunocompromised people would be notified of an appointment for a third dose of COVID-19 vaccine from Wednesday 29 September, as Ireland's COVID-19 booster vaccination campaign would commence.
- 25 September – Ireland's mandatory hotel quarantine system ended immediately following an announcement by Minister for Health Stephen Donnelly, with all countries removed from the list of "high-risk" countries for international travel.
- 28 September – According to the Bloomberg COVID-19 resilience ranking, Ireland was named the best country to be in for how it dealt with the pandemic and the rise of the Delta variant.
- 30 September
  - A further 1,271 cases were reported, bringing the total number of confirmed cases to 389,932.
  - A pilot nightclub event took place at the Button Factory in Dublin, which included a 60% capacity crowd of 450 people, vaccination certificates and antigen testing.

=== October 2021 ===
- 10 October – HSE CEO Paul Reid said the number of people in ICU with COVID-19 had risen by 20% in one week, with 67% of the ICU patients not vaccinated and 3% partially vaccinated.
- 11 October – The number of patients being treated in hospital with COVID-19 increased to 400, the highest since 8 March, while HSE Chief Clinical Officer Colm Henry revealed that up to 50,000 adults over the age of 40 were not yet vaccinated.
- 13 October
  - Deputy Chief Medical Officer Ronan Glynn said there were still 300,000 adults who had not been vaccinated and that two out of every three people in ICU were unvaccinated.
  - Taoiseach Micheál Martin said he could not guarantee that the removal of COVID-19 restrictions on 22 October would proceed as planned and that the trajectory of the virus had taken a wrong turn with a sudden increase in case numbers, while Minister for Health Stephen Donnelly said he was self-isolating after experiencing mild symptoms.
- 18 October – NPHET urged the Government to pause the easing of restrictions on Friday 22 October, with social distancing, mask-wearing and vaccine certificates to remain, while the NIAC approved vaccine boosters for people aged 60 and over.
- 19 October – The Government published a revised plan for the easing of restrictions on 22 October, with nightclubs allowed to reopen, the return of normal trading hours in pubs and restaurants, no attendance limits on weddings and religious ceremonies and 100% capacity allowed at sporting venues, while the continued use of masks, vaccine certificates and social distancing measures would remain in place until at least February 2022.
- 20 October – a further 2,148 cases and 63 deaths were reported, bringing the totals to 421,234 cases and 5,369 deaths.
- 21 October
  - A further 2,029 cases were reported, bringing the total number of confirmed cases to 423,260.
  - Updated guidelines for hospitality and for the reopening of nightclubs on 22 October were published, with nightclubs allowed to operate at 100% capacity, a maximum of 1,500 people permitted to dance or stand at live music venues and multiple table bookings allowed in pubs and restaurants.
- 22 October – Nightclubs and late venues reopened after almost 600 days of closure, as new guidelines were published.
- 28 October – The HSE began to send antigen tests to people who were deemed close contacts of a COVID-19 case.
- 31 October – A further 1,963 cases were reported, bringing the total number of confirmed cases to 445,594.

=== November 2021 ===
- 2 November – A ceremony was held in Dublin to remember the lives of people lost during the COVID-19 pandemic.
- 5 November – The HSE began rolling out COVID-19 booster vaccines for those aged 60 and over.
- 11 November – A 14-year-old teenager became Ireland's youngest person to die with COVID-19.
- 16 November – The Government announced a series of measures in a bid to curb the spread of COVID-19, with a closing time for bars, restaurants and nightclubs to be midnight, household contacts of a person with COVID-19 to restrict movements for five days and take three antigen tests, people required to work from home where possible and vaccination certificates required for cinemas and theatres.
- 26 November – Minister for Health Stephen Donnelly announced that COVID-19 booster vaccines would be offered to everyone aged 16 and over, starting with pregnant women aged over 16, those aged 40 to 49 and those aged 16 to 39, following new recommendations from NIAC.
- 27 November
  - The NPHET Epidemiological Modelling Advisory Group began meeting to monitor the Omicron variant situation in Europe, and began considering further required measures.
  - Thousands of people attended a protest against COVID-19 restrictions and vaccine passports at the GPO on Dublin's O'Connell Street.
- 30 November
  - A further 5,471 cases were reported, bringing the total number of confirmed cases to 570,115.
  - The Government announced additional measures in a bid to curb the spread of COVID-19, with parents of children aged 12 and under urged to reduce socialisation indoors, a negative test required for people arriving into Ireland from Friday 3 December, the re-establishment of mandatory hotel quarantine, the wearing of face coverings for children aged 9 years and over on public transport, in retail and for children in third class and above.

=== December 2021 ===
- 1 December – Tests carried out at the National Virus Reference Laboratory confirmed that the first case of the Omicron variant had been detected in Ireland.
- 3 December – The Government reintroduced a series of measures that would commence from 7 December to 9 January amid concerns of the Omicron variant, with nightclubs to close, bars and restaurants to revert to six adults per table and no multiple table bookings allowed, indoor cultural and sporting events to operate at 50% capacity, a maximum of four households allowed to meet indoors, the Pandemic Unemployment Payment to be reinstated and the requirement of vaccination certificates extended to gyms, leisure centres and hotel bars.
- 8 December – The NIAC recommended that COVID-19 vaccinations be offered to children aged five to 11 years.
- 9 December – Five additional cases of the Omicron variant were detected, bringing to six the total number of cases that had been identified in Ireland following whole genome sequencing.
- 15 December – Cases of the Omicron variant increased sharply as the Chief Medical Officer Tony Holohan urged people to take precautions to avoid being in isolation for Christmas.
- 17 December – To curb the spread of COVID-19 over the Christmas period, the Government announced an 8pm closing time for bars, restaurants, live events, cinemas and theatres that would commence from 20 December to 30 January.
- 19 December – A further 5,124 cases were reported. Chief Medical Officer Tony Holohan announced that the Omicron variant was now the dominant variant in Ireland after it was confirmed that 52% of cases were now due to Omicron.
- 23 December
  - A further 7,411 cases were reported. Chief Medical Officer Tony Holohan confirmed that almost 75% of cases were now due to the Omicron variant.
  - Minister for Health Stephen Donnelly announced that booster vaccines would be offered to everyone aged 30 and over from 29 December and to all remaining age groups from 10 January.
- 24 December – A further 11,182 cases were reported. It was confirmed that 83% of cases were now due to the Omicron variant.
- 25 December – Cases began to rise sharply after Christmas.
- 29 December
  - A further 16,428 cases and 22 deaths were reported. Chief Medical Officer Tony Holohan expressed concern and stated that "every individual should consider themselves potentially infectious".
- 30 December – a further 20,554 cases were reported, bringing the total number of confirmed cases to 768,449. Chief Medical Officer Tony Holohan confirmed that 92% of cases were now due to the Omicron variant, while he urged people to keep social contacts low and not to hold household gatherings on New Year's Eve.
- 31 December
  - A further 20,110 cases were reported, bringing the total number of confirmed cases to 788,559.
  - Minister for Health Stephen Donnelly announced that booster vaccines would be offered to everyone aged 16 and over from 2 January 2022, eight days earlier than planned.
