= National Immunisation Advisory Committee =

Irish health advisory body

Agency overview
- Formed: 1998; 27 years ago
- Jurisdiction: Government of Ireland
- Agency executive: Edina Moylett, Chair
- Parent department: Health Information and Quality Authority
- Website: www.hiqa.ie/areas-we-work/national-immunisation-advisory-committee

The National Immunisation Advisory Committee (NIAC) is an Irish advisory body that advises the Chief Medical Officer and Department of Health in the area of immunisation procedures and related matters. NIAC was established within the Royal College of Physicians of Ireland (RCPI) in 1998. In March 2025, it moved to the Health Information and Quality Authority. It comprises representatives from a broad range of medical and healthcare organisations with expertise in immunisation.

== Purpose ==
According to its Term of Reference, the purposes of NIAC are as follows:

- To provide advice to the Department of Health on vaccines, immunisation and related health matters in the Irish context
- To develop and disseminate the National Immunisation Guidelines for Ireland
- To advocate for best immunisation practices

== Membership ==
The members of NIAC is nominated by the organisations listed and approved by the President of the RCPI. Those nominated to NIAC will serve a four-year term and may only be re-elected to serve one additional term.

As of 2023, Dr Siobhan O'Sullivan serves as the Chair of NIAC.

=== Voting membership ===
Voting membership nominating organisations:

- Faculty of Occupational Medicine, RCPI
- Faculty of Paediatrics, RCPI
- Faculty of Pathology, RCPI
- Faculty of Public Health Medicine, RCPI
- Health Protection Surveillance Centre
- Infectious Disease Society of Ireland
- Institute of Medicine
- Institute of Obstetricians and Gynaecologists
- Irish College of General Practitioners
- Lay public representatives
- National Immunisation Office
- Nursing and Midwifery Board of Ireland
- Royal College of Physicians of Ireland
- Royal College of Surgeons in Ireland
- Special Clinical Advisors
- Travel Medicine Society of Ireland
- National Virus Reference Laboratory

=== Additional Membership ===
In addition to voting membership, NIAC memberships are also nominated from the following organisation. The additional members have access to NIAC meetings, papers and may contribute to NIAC discussion, but will not have voting rights in order to maintain NIAC's independence.

- Department of Health
- Health Service Executive
- Health Products Regulatory Authority
- Department of Health, Northern Ireland
- Medical Secretaries (Specialist Registrars in Public Health Medicine, Infectious Diseases or Paediatrics)

== Meetings ==
NIAC will meet once every two months. However, the Chair of NIAC or President of the RCPI have the power to call an extraordinary meeting if required. A record of attendance is maintained at every meeting and minutes of meeting will be included in the NIAC annual report and publicly available. NIAC meetings requires the presence of at least 50% of the voting members plus one voting member during the entire meeting and for decision making purposes.

== See also ==
- National Immunization Technical Advisory Group (the global concept)
- Advisory Committee on Immunization Practices (United States)
- Joint Committee on Vaccination and Immunisation (United Kingdom)
- National Advisory Committee on Immunization (Canada)
