= COVID-19 vaccination in the Republic of Ireland =

Immunisation plan against COVID-19

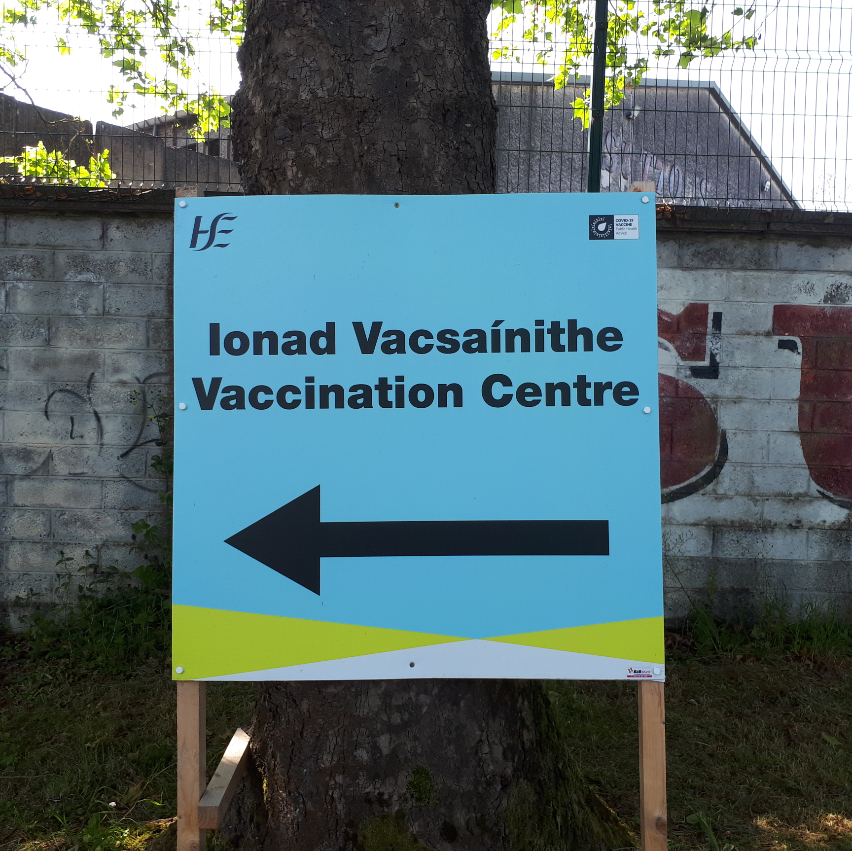
- Large vaccination centres were put in place nationwide to administer COVID-19 vaccines
- Date: 29 December 2020 – present (5 years, 5 months ago)
- Location: (Republic of Ireland) Ireland
- Cause: COVID-19 pandemic
- Organised by: Health Service Executive (HSE)
- Participants: 12,744,694 (doses administered); 4,107,865 (at least one dose); 3,819,227 (second dose); 4,817,602 (boosters)
- Outcome: 85% of the Irish eligible population (5+) are fully vaccinated 77.1% of the Irish adult population (18+) have received a first booster dose 27.7% of the Irish adult population (18+) have received a second booster dose 8.5% of the Irish adult population (18+) have received a third booster dose
- Website: gov.ie
- As of February 2023

The COVID-19 vaccination programme in the Republic of Ireland is an ongoing mass immunisation campaign that began on 29 December 2020 in response to the COVID-19 pandemic in Ireland. Ireland's vaccination rollout has been praised as one of the most successful rollouts in the world and was ranked number one in the European Union in terms of its percentage of adult population fully vaccinated, and was also ranked number one in the EU for the number of booster vaccines administered.

As of 20 February 2023, 12,744,694 vaccine doses have been administered, of which 4,107,865 people have received at least one dose, 3,819,227 have received their second dose and 4,817,602 have received a booster dose.

== Background ==
=== Preparations ===
On 1 December 2020, the Government of Ireland approved an advance purchase agreement for 875,000 doses of the Moderna COVID-19 vaccine.

On 15 December, Minister for Health Stephen Donnelly announced the Government's National COVID-19 Vaccination Strategy, which outlined the country's high-level plan for safe, effective and efficient vaccination of the Republic of Ireland, while safeguarding continued provision of health and social care services.

On 17 January 2021, the Government requested early deliveries of the Oxford–AstraZeneca COVID-19 vaccine as discussions to secure early delivery of the vaccine got underway.

=== Vaccines on order ===
Vaccine	Approval	Deployment
Pfizer–BioNTech	21 December 2020	29 December 2020
Moderna	6 January 2021	16 January 2021
Oxford–AstraZeneca	29 January 2021	8 February 2021
Janssen	11 March 2021	6 May 2021
Novavax	20 December 2021	29 January 2022

=== COVID-19 booster campaign ===
The Health Service Executive (HSE) announced on 24 September that immunocompromised people aged over 12 would be notified of an appointment for a third dose of COVID-19 vaccine from Wednesday 29 September, as Ireland's COVID-19 booster vaccination campaign would commence. In addition, the National Immunisation Advisory Committee recommended additional vaccines be given to elderly people aged over 80 and to anyone over 65 in a long-term care facility.

On 19 October, the National Immunisation Advisory Committee (NIAC) approved vaccine boosters for people aged 60 and over.

On 1 November, following new advice from NIAC, Minister for Health Stephen Donnelly authorised the use of booster vaccines for healthcare staff, while boosters were extended to people aged 50 to 59, those aged 16 to 59 with an underlying condition and all long-term healthcare facility residents on 16 November. On 26 November, Minister for Health Stephen Donnelly announced that booster vaccines would be offered to everyone aged 16 and over, starting with pregnant women aged over 16, those aged 40 to 49 and those aged 16 to 39, following new recommendations from NIAC.

On 13 December, the NIAC recommended that people would be able to receive a booster dose three months after their second dose.

On 19 December, the booster vaccination programme began for people aged 40 to 49. On 23 December, Minister for Health Stephen Donnelly announced that booster vaccines would be offered to everyone aged 30 and over from 29 December, and announced on New Year's Eve that booster vaccines would be offered to all remaining age groups from 2 January 2022, eight days earlier than planned.

On 21 February 2022, Minister for Health Stephen Donnelly accepted recommendations from NIAC that booster vaccines be offered to children aged 12 to 15 years.

On 6 April, the NIAC recommended a fourth COVID-19 vaccine dose for everyone aged 65 and older, and for those aged 12 and older who are immunocompromised. On 21 April, the HSE announced that people aged 65 years and older could book online for their second COVID-19 booster vaccine appointment at vaccination centres.

On 23 July, Minister for Health Stephen Donnelly accepted new recommendations from the NIAC over Ireland's autumn COVID-19 vaccination programme, which would see a first, second or third booster vaccine given to certain age groups.

On 29 December, the HSE announced that people aged 18 to 49 would be offered their second booster dose and a first vaccine for infants and children aged six months to four years was also authorised amid concerns about a rise in cases of COVID-19, influenza and other respiratory illness.

== Timeline ==
=== December 2020 ===
Annie Lynch, a 79-year-old woman, became the first person in the Republic of Ireland to receive the Pfizer–BioNTech vaccine at St. James's Hospital, Dublin on 29 December 2020, and received the second dose three weeks later on Tuesday 19 January 2021.

On Saint Stephen's Day, 26 December, the first shipment of 10,000 Pfizer–BioNTech vaccines arrived in the country.

Maura Byrne, a 95-year-old woman, became the first nursing home resident in the Republic of Ireland to receive the Pfizer–BioNTech vaccine on 5 January 2021, while Dr Eavan Muldoon, an infectious diseases consultant, became the first healthcare worker in the Mater University Hospital to receive the vaccine. On the same day, Taoiseach Micheál Martin announced that up to 135,000 people would be vaccinated nationwide by the end of February 2021.

=== January 2021 ===
Following the approval of the Moderna COVID-19 vaccine by the European Medicines Agency on 6 January 2021, Tánaiste Leo Varadkar announced that the vaccine would allow 10,000 more people in Ireland to be vaccinated per week.

The rollout of the Pfizer–BioNTech vaccine in private and voluntary nursing homes began nationwide on 7 January, with 22 nursing homes of 3,000 residents and staff to be vaccinated.

The first shipment of the Moderna COVID-19 vaccine arrived in the Republic of Ireland on 12 January.

Around 1,800 healthcare workers received the Moderna vaccine at three mass vaccination centres that opened in Dublin, Galway and Portlaoise on 16 January.

=== February 2021 ===
The first shipment of 21,600 AstraZeneca vaccines arrived in the country on 6 February.

On 24 February, Minister for Health Stephen Donnelly announced that Ireland had ordered enough vaccines to vaccinate 10.3 million people with 18.5 million doses of COVID-19 vaccines ordered.

=== March 2021 ===
On 6 March, Taoiseach Micheál Martin announced that Ireland had reached the milestone of half a million COVID-19 vaccines administered.

On 10 March, Taoiseach Micheál Martin confirmed that Ireland was to receive a further 46,500 doses of the Pfizer–BioNTech COVID-19 vaccine before the end of March.

On 22 March, it was announced that President Michael D. Higgins and his wife Sabina Higgins received their first doses of a COVID-19 vaccine on 19 March.

=== April 2021 ===
On 8 April, the CEO of the Health Service Executive (HSE) Paul Reid announced that Ireland had reached the milestone of one million COVID-19 vaccines administered.

On 15 April, over 26,000 people registered for a COVID-19 vaccination after the online portal for 69-year-olds went live.

On 25 April, Taoiseach Micheál Martin announced that Ireland had reached the milestone of one million first doses of COVID-19 vaccines administered.

=== May 2021 ===
On 9 May, Taoiseach Micheál Martin received his first dose of a COVID-19 vaccine in Cork City Hall and urged people to get vaccinated to protect themselves, while a record 52,278 doses were administered on Friday 7 May.

On 17 May, the National Immunisation Advisory Committee (NIAC) confirmed that people in their 40s would be given a choice to accept the Johnson & Johnson or AstraZeneca COVID-19 vaccine or opt to wait for another vaccine.

=== June 2021 ===
On 2 June, NIAC advised that the gap between two doses of the AstraZeneca vaccine could be reduced from 12 weeks to 8 weeks.

On 5 June, Minister for Health Stephen Donnelly received his first dose of a COVID-19 vaccine in Greystones, County Wicklow.

=== July 2021 ===
On 2 July, following recommendations from NIAC, Minister for Health Stephen Donnelly announced an expansion of the vaccination rollout programme to younger people with 750 pharmacies to begin administering the Janssen vaccine to people in the 18 to 34 age group who opted in for earlier vaccination from 5 July, while vaccination centres would begin administering the AstraZeneca vaccine to the group from 12 July. On 5 July, over 500 pharmacies around the country began administering the Johnson & Johnson vaccine to people aged 18 to 34 who opted-in to receive it.

On 27 July, after the COVID-19 vaccine registration portal opened to people aged 16 and 17 for the Pfizer or Moderna vaccines, the Government agreed to extend the vaccination programme to those aged 12 to 15 following recommendations from the National Immunisation Advisory Committee. On the evening of 11 August, the COVID-19 vaccine registration portal opened to people aged 12 to 15 for the Pfizer or Moderna vaccines. On 12 August, the Chief Executive of the HSE Paul Reid said the vaccination programme was in "the final leg" after more than 50,000 people aged 12 to 15 registered to receive the COVID-19 vaccine, with 90% of adults partially vaccinated and 80% fully vaccinated.

=== August 2021 ===
On 3 August, Taoiseach Micheál Martin announced that a deal had been completed to secure 700,000 Pfizer COVID-19 vaccines from Romania.

On 18 August, Ireland received its largest ever weekly shipment of COVID-19 vaccines, with over 540,000 doses delivered to the HSE, including the first batch of unwanted vaccines from the Romanian Government.

=== September 2021 ===
On 1 September, under changes to the COVID-19 vaccination programme, the National Immunisation Advisory Committee recommended that pregnant women could be offered an mRNA COVID-19 vaccine at any stage of pregnancy and that immunocompromised individuals aged 12 and older could receive a third additional vaccine dose.

On 8 September, Minister for Health Stephen Donnelly announced an update to Ireland's COVID-19 vaccination programme, with residents aged 65 years and older living in long term residential care facilities and people aged 80 years and older living in the community to receive a booster dose of an mRNA COVID-19 vaccine. Two days later on 10 September, latest figures showed that 90% of adults in Ireland were fully vaccinated against COVID-19, while the seven-millionth dose was administered. This is one of the highest levels of vaccination in the European Union.

=== November 2021 ===
On 25 November, the HSE began preliminary planning for offering COVID-19 vaccines to children aged 5 to 11. after the European Medicines Agency (EMA) gave its approval.

=== December 2021 ===
On 8 December, the NIAC recommended that COVID-19 vaccinations be offered to children aged five to 11 years.

=== January 2022 ===
On 3 January 2022, vaccine registration began for all children aged 5 to 11, and vaccinations for this age group began on 8 January.

== Vaccination certificates ==
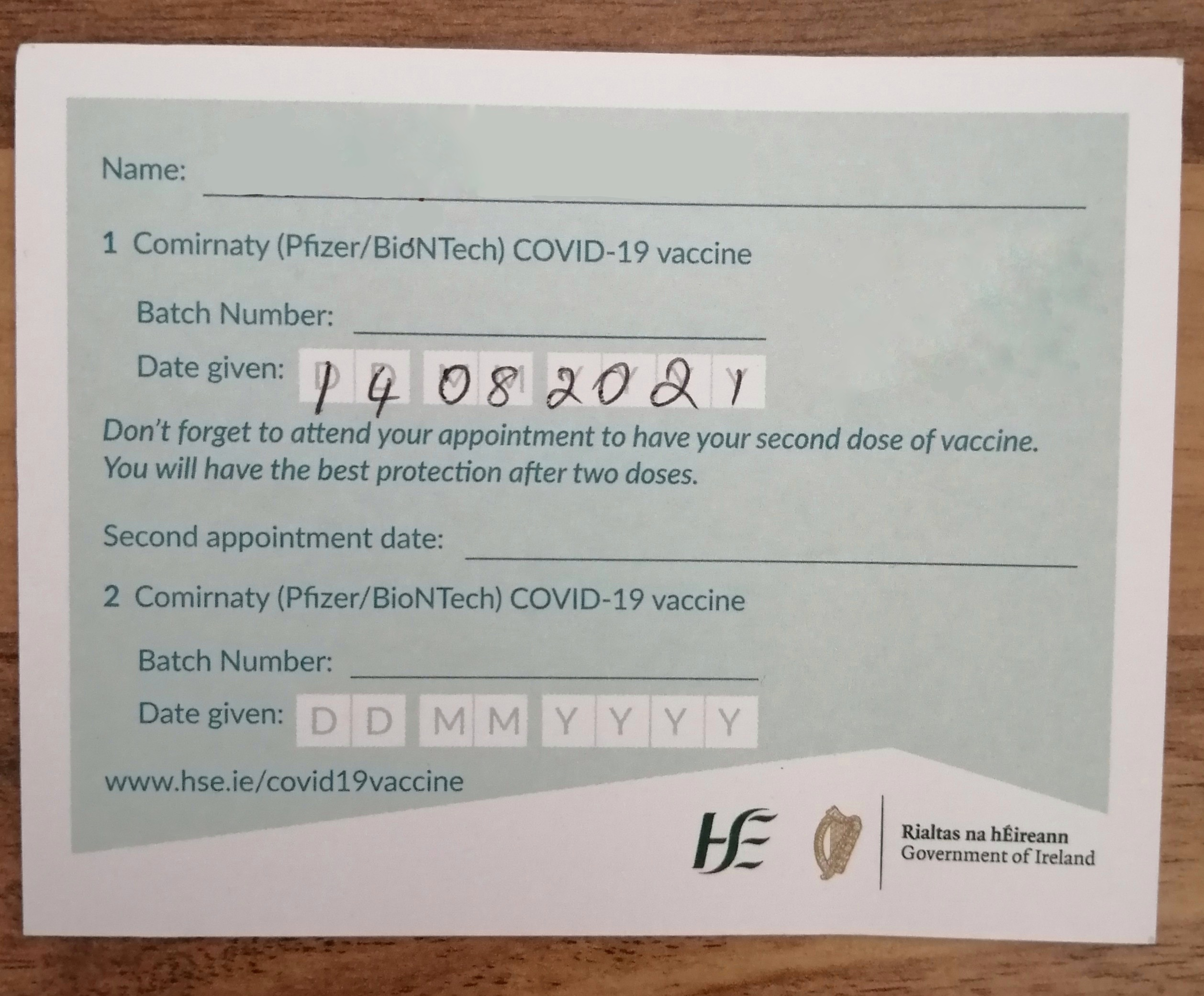
A COVID-19 Vaccination Record Card issued by the HSE in August 2021.

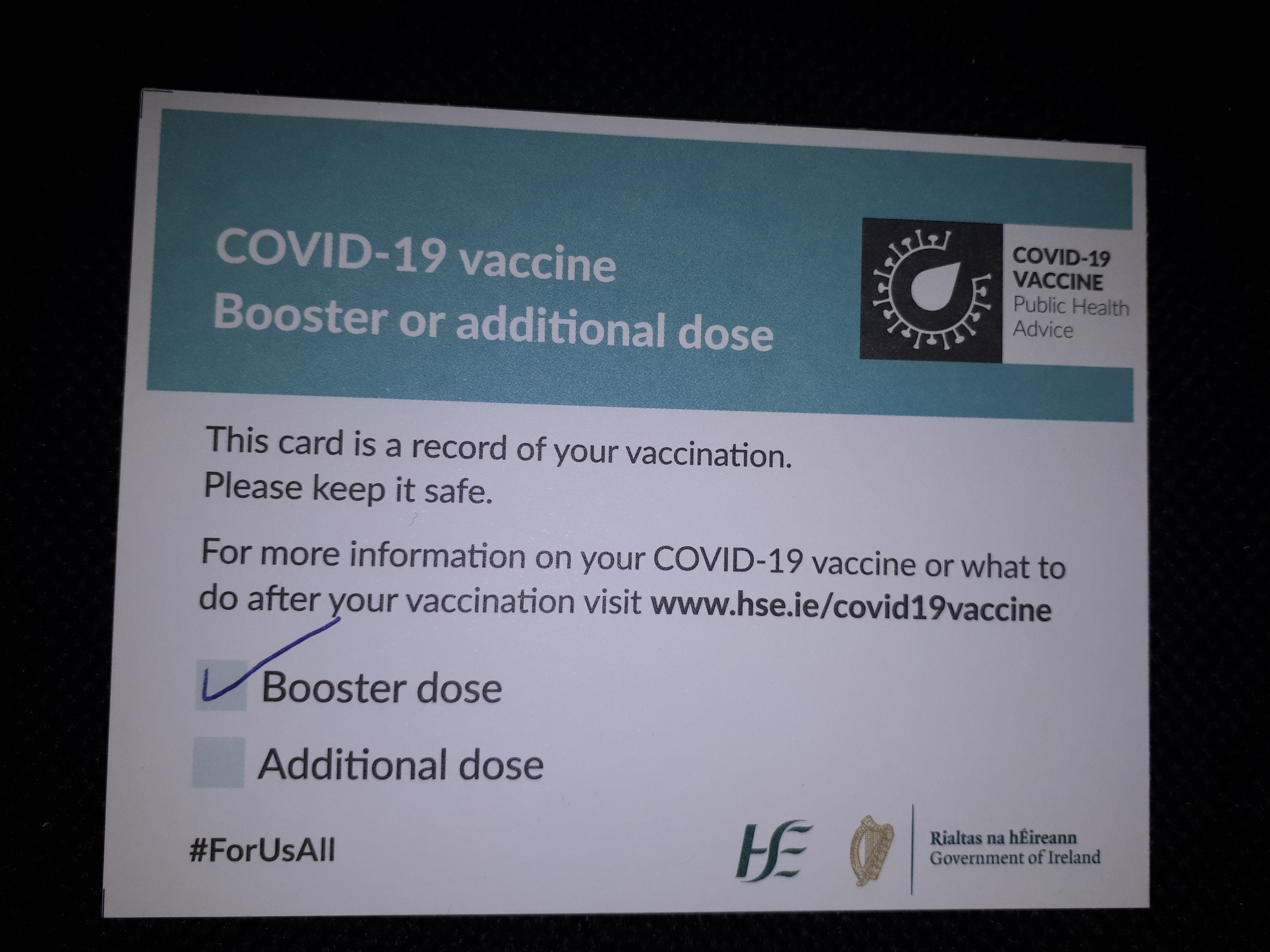
A COVID-19 Vaccine Booster Record Card issued by the HSE in January 2022.

The Health Service Executive (HSE) issues a vaccine record card to those receiving a COVID-19 vaccine in Ireland that provides reminders for a follow-up appointment. The card contains the recipient's name, the dates on which the two doses were administered, the name of the vaccine, and its batch number. The vaccine record card, along with the EU Digital COVID Certificate, were used as proofs of vaccination in restaurants, hotels and bars to gain access to indoor hospitality, as well as in nightclubs, indoor live entertainment, cinemas, theatres and gyms. Requirements on the use of vaccine certificates were scrapped in January 2022.

== Vaccine rollout and distribution ==
=== Vaccine priority groups ===
The COVID-19 Vaccine Allocation Strategy currently includes 9 priority groups for the vaccine rollout in Ireland.

On 23 February, following the publication of the Government's new revised Living with COVID-19 plan called "The Path Ahead", Minister for Health Stephen Donnelly announced an update to the COVID-19 Vaccine Allocation Strategy with people aged between 16 and 69 who are at very high risk of developing severe COVID-19 moved up the priority list, after the National Public Health Emergency Team endorsed recommendations by the National Immunisation Advisory Committee.

On 30 March, Minister for Health Stephen Donnelly announced an update to the COVID-19 Vaccine Allocation Strategy with priority groups being changed to an age-based system after vulnerable people with underlying conditions were vaccinated.

Ireland's COVID-19 vaccination programme (January–July 2021)
January–March	April–May	May–July
1.	2.	3.
People aged over 80; Frontline healthcare workers; People aged over 65 in long-term care facilities	People aged 65–79; People at high or very high risk; Key vaccination workers; Other vulnerable groups	Everyone aged 18–64

Order	Priority group
1	People aged 65 years and older who are residents of long-term care facilities
2	Frontline healthcare workers
3	People aged 70 and older
4	People aged 16–69 whose medical condition puts them at very high risk of severe disease and death
5	People aged 65–69 whose underlying condition puts them at a high risk of severe disease and death
6	Other people aged 65–69, other healthcare workers not in direct patient contact, and key workers
7	People aged 16–64 whose underlying condition puts them at high risk of severe disease and death
8	Residents of long-term care facilities aged 18–64
9	People aged 64 years and younger, and people aged 16–64 living or working in crowded settings
9	55–64 years
9	45–54 years
9	35–44 years
9	25–34 years
9	16–24 years
10
10	12–15 years
10	5–11 years

"People who have an underlying condition that puts them at high risk of severe disease and death" is defined as:

- People with cancer
  - Haematological – within 1 year
  - Haematological – within 1–5 years
  - Non-haematological – within 1 year
  - All other cancers on non-hormonal treatment
- People with chronic heart (and vascular) disease (e.g. heart failure, hypertensive cardiac disease)
- People with chronic kidney disease with eGFR <30ml/min
- People with chronic liver disease (e.g. cirrhosis or fibrosis)
- People with chronic neurological disease or condition (e.g. Parkinson's disease, cerebral palsy.
- People with chronic respiratory disease (e.g. stable cystic fibrosis, severe asthma (continuous or repeated use of systemic corticosteroids), moderate COPD)
- People with diabetes (Type 1 and 2)
- People who are immunocompromised due to disease or treatment (e.g. high dose systemic steroids, persons living with HIV)
- People with inherited metabolic diseases
- People with intellectual disabilities (excluding Down syndrome)
- People who are obese (BMI >35 kg/m^{2})
- People with severe mental illness (e.g. schizophrenia, bipolar disorder, severe depression)

== Organisations involved ==
A High-Level Task Force on COVID-19 Vaccination was established on 11 November 2020 to oversee the roll-out of COVID-19 vaccines in the country once they were approved by the statutory authorities, and to support the Department of Health and Health Service Executive (HSE) to deliver a COVID-19 immunisation programme that meets best practice and provides good governance. The first full meeting of the task force took place on 23 November 2020 and was chaired by Professor Brian MacCraith.

Members of the High-Level Task Force on COVID-19 Vaccination are made up of senior representatives from the Department of Health, the Health Service Executive, the Health Products Regulatory Authority, the Office of the Government Chief Information Officer, the Office of Government Procurement, IDA Ireland, the Dublin Airport Authority, the Department of Enterprise, Trade and Employment and the Department of the Taoiseach.

The National Immunisation Advisory Committee (an independent body outside of the HSE) provides expert, evidence-based and impartial guidance about the COVID-19 vaccines to the Chief Medical Officer in the Department of Health.

== Progress to date ==
Total doses administered by vaccine type as of 21 February 2023
1. Pfizer–BioNTech (6,013,524) (74.6%)
2. Oxford–AstraZeneca (1,217,512) (15.1%)
3. Moderna (585,177) (7.26%)
4. Janssen J&J (241,233) (2.99%)
5. Novavax (450) (0.00%)

Uptake by age group
Age group	Third booster	Second booster	First booster	Primary course	At least one dose	Not vaccinated
80+ years	49.1%	90.1%	100%	100%	100%	0%
60+ years	31.6%	74.2%	100%	100%	100%	0%
50–59 years	0.5%	34.4%	87.9%	99%	100%	0%
25–49 years	0.1%	5.1%	65.1%	90%	91%	9%
18–24 years	0%	1.6%	53.7%	88.8%	90.1%	9.9%
<18 years	0%	0.1%	8%	32.9%	34.1%	65.9%

== Vaccination centres ==
Up to 40 large vaccination centres were put in place across the country to administer COVID-19 vaccines.

Major facilities were put in place in Cork, Dublin, Waterford, Sligo, Galway, Limerick and Athlone, with smaller centres in Mullingar, Longford, Ennis, Nenagh, Bantry and Tralee. Three GP-run vaccination centres were also put in place across the country, with The Helix at Dublin City University the first to be established, vaccinating 5,000 people a day. Cork City Hall, Páirc Uí Chaoimh GAA grounds and Munster Technological University's Bishopstown campus were transformed into mass vaccination centres, administering 10,000 shots a day.

Large venues such as sports stadia, GAA clubs, hotels, conference centres and arenas were used as mass vaccination centres across all counties in Ireland.

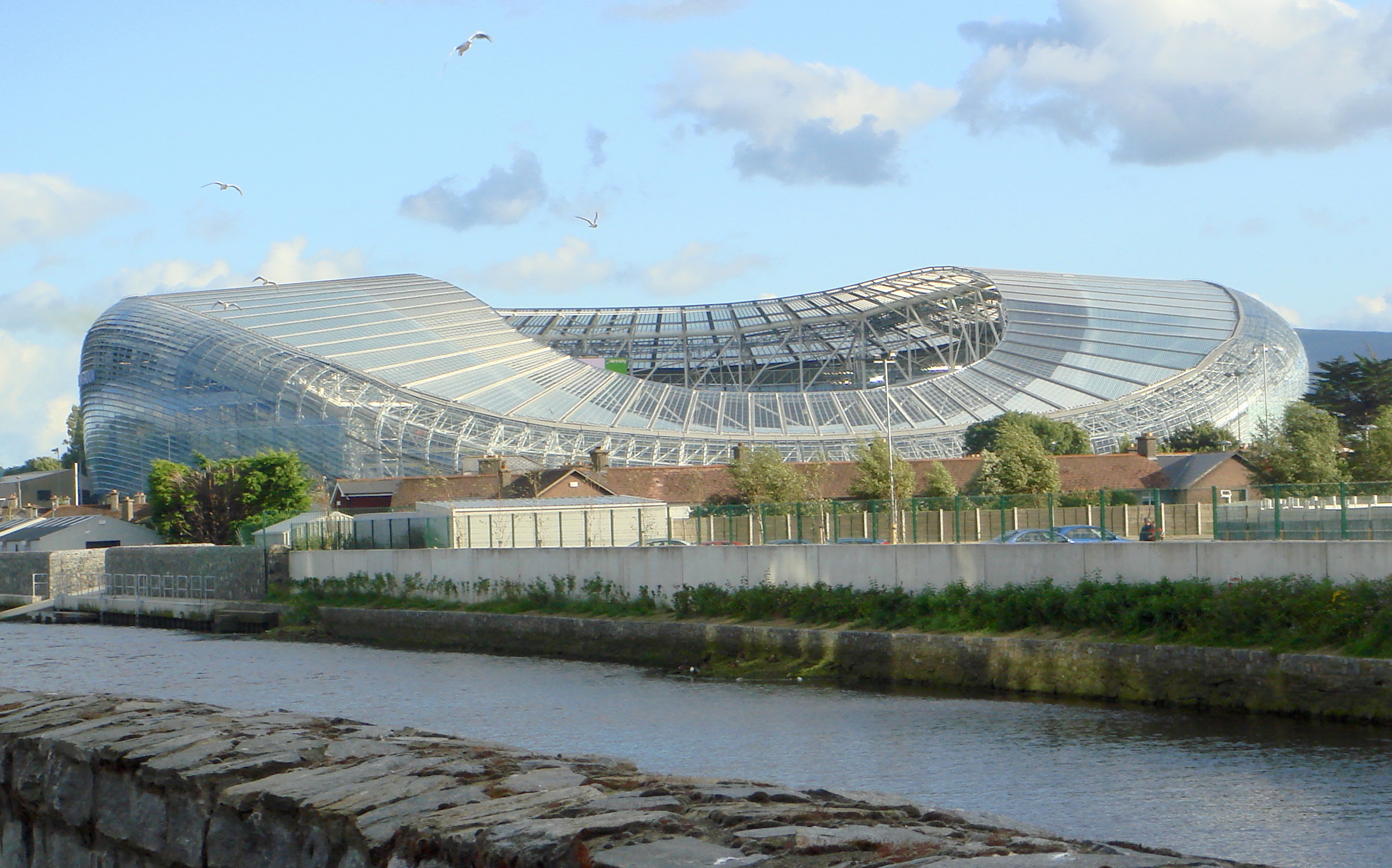
Aviva Stadium vaccination centre.

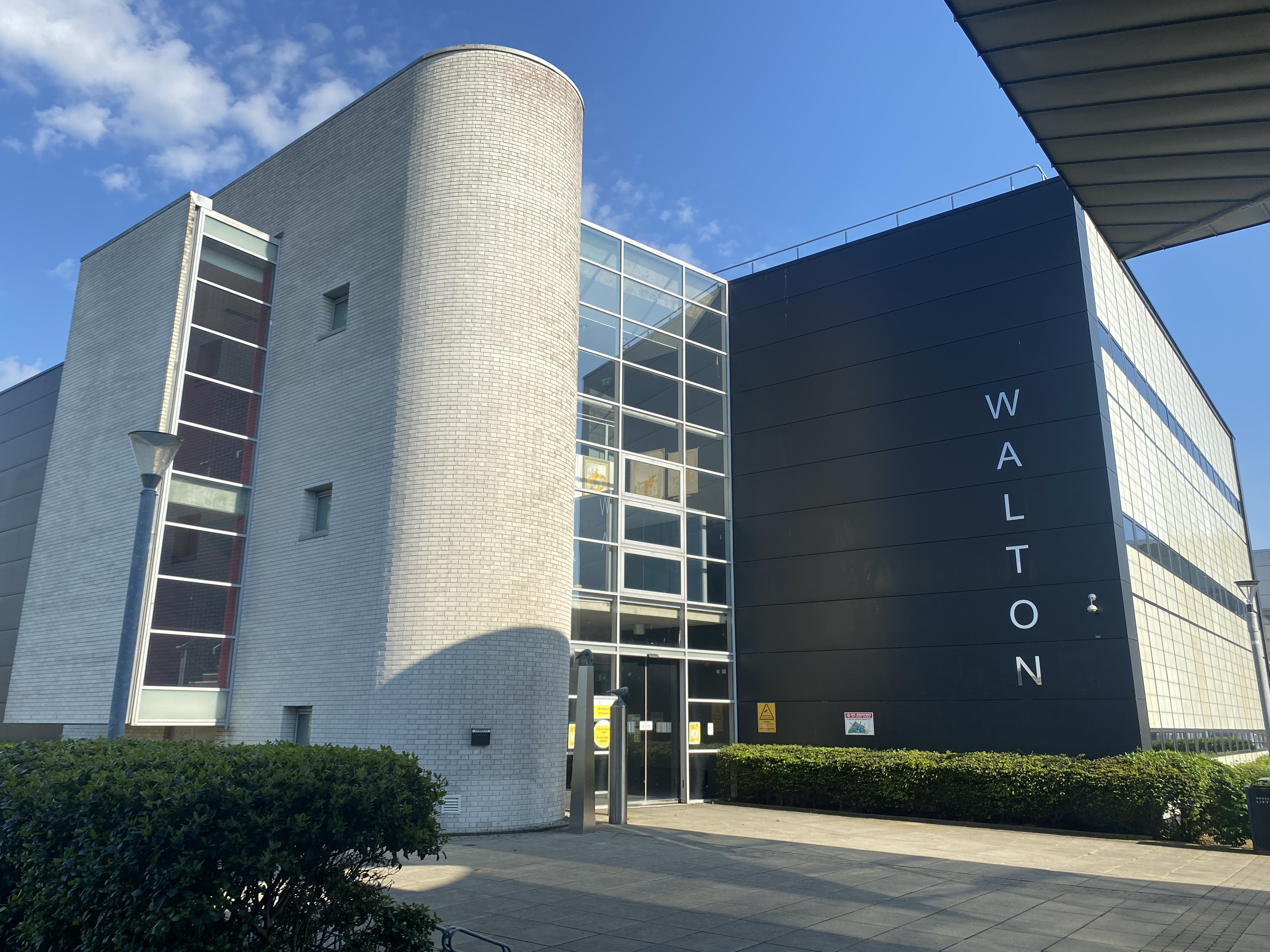
Waterford IT Arena vaccination centre.

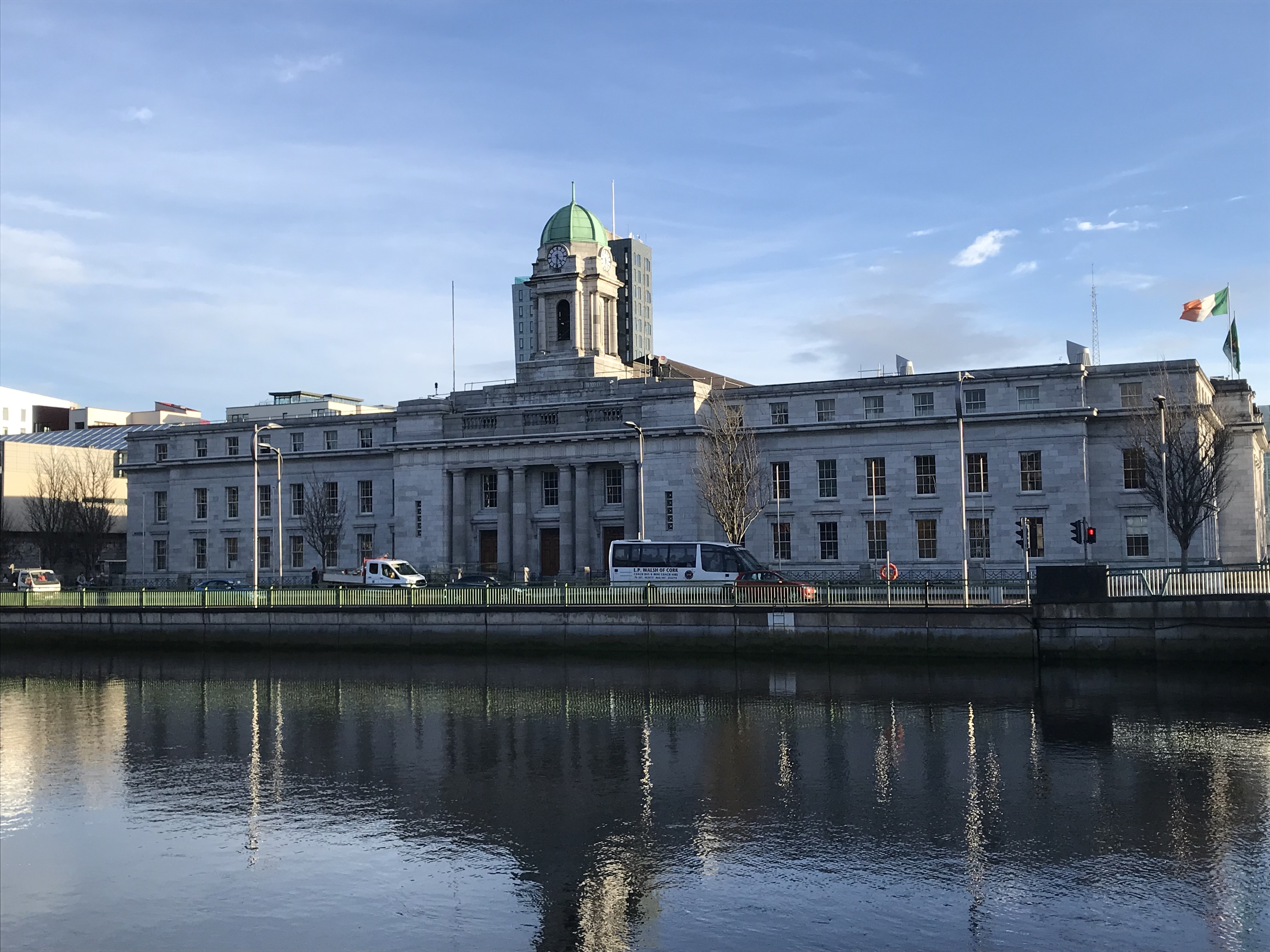
Cork City Hall vaccination centre.

=== Locations ===
On 15 February, Minister for Health Stephen Donnelly confirmed locations for 37 vaccination centres across all counties as part of the country's COVID-19 vaccination programme.

On 20 February, nearly 1,000 patients over the age of 85 received their first dose of a COVID-19 vaccine at the country's first mass vaccination centre at The Helix in Dublin City University.

On 28 July, it was announced that some of the vaccination centres would allow walk-in vaccinations on certain days and times without an appointment.

COVID-19 vaccination in the Republic of Ireland (island of Ireland)

Location of vaccination centres in the Republic of Ireland
Centre	County
Carlow IT	Carlow
Kilmore Hotel	Cavan
West County Hotel, Ennis	Clare
Bantry Primary Care Centre	Cork
City Hall, Cork	Cork
Páirc Uí Chaoimh	Cork
Clonakilty GAA Club	Cork
MTU Cork, Bishopstown	Cork
Mallow GAA Club	Cork
Letterkenny IT	Donegal
Aviva Stadium	Dublin
Citywest Convention Centre	Dublin
Croke Park	Dublin
The Helix, DCU (until July 2021)	Dublin
National Show Centre, Swords (from July 2021)	Dublin
Ballybrit Racecourse	Galway
MTU Kerry, Tralee	Kerry
Killarney Sports & Leisure Centre	Kerry
Punchestown Racecourse	Kildare
Cillin Hill Conference Centre	Kilkenny
Midlands Park Hotel, Portlaoise	Laois
Primary Care Unit, Carrick-on-Shannon	Leitrim
Radisson Hotel (until July 2021)	Limerick
Limerick Racecourse (from July 2021)	Limerick
Clonguish GAA Club, Newtownforbes	Longford
Fairways Hotel, Dundalk	Louth
Simonstown Gaels GAA Club, Navan	Meath
Breaffy House Resort, Castlebar	Mayo
Hillgrove Hotel	Monaghan
Tullamore Court Hotel	Offaly
Abbey Hotel	Roscommon
Sligo IT	Sligo
Abbeycourt Hotel, Nenagh	Tipperary
Clonmel Park Hotel	Tipperary
Waterford IT Arena	Waterford
Athlone IT Arena (until September 2021)	Westmeath
Moate Community Centre (from September 2021)	Westmeath
Bloomfield House Hotel, Mullingar (until September 2021)	Westmeath
Riverside Hotel, Enniscorthy (until July 2021)	Wexford
Astro Active Centre, Enniscorthy (from July 2021)	Wexford
Kilanerin Community Centre, Gorey (from June 2021)	Wexford
Arklow Bay Hotel (until June 2021)	Wicklow
Shoreline Leisure Centre, Greystones	Wicklow

== Issues and controversies ==
=== Adverse events ===
On 14 March 2021, the administration of the AstraZeneca COVID-19 vaccine was suspended in Ireland by the National Immunisation Advisory Committee (NIAC) as a precautionary measure following concerns over serious blood clots in Norway. On 19 March, the NIAC recommended that the AstraZeneca COVID-19 vaccine could continue to be used in Ireland following approval from the European Medicines Agency (EMA) on 18 March.

On 8 April, the Health Products Regulatory Authority (HPRA) began an investigation after the first case of a very rare blood clot in the brain of a person after vaccination with the AstraZeneca vaccine was confirmed in a 40-year-old Dublin woman.

On 12 April, following a lengthy meeting, the National Immunisation Advisory Committee (NIAC) recommend that only people over 60 years of age should get the AstraZeneca COVID-19 vaccine and that a second dose of the vaccine should not be given to anyone who developed unusual blood clots with low platelets after the first dose.

On 17 August, a 23-year-old man from Waterford died five days after receiving the Janssen COVID-19 vaccine. In September 2024, an inquest into his death was told that he had suffered convulsions at home and was rushed to hospital where he was put on a life support machine. He died after a large haematoma in his brain caused a catastrophic intercranial bleed. The inquest heard he was a "perfectly healthy young man before the vaccine" who was a "keen soccer player" for Waterford F.C. and a "natural leader". Medics at Janssen gave evidence at the inquest and concluded there was "insufficient evidence” to link the haemorrhage to the vaccine.

=== Hospitals ===
On 26 March 2021, the Labour Party leader Alan Kelly called for the chief executive of the Beacon Hospital to resign after it gave 20 leftover COVID-19 vaccines to a number of teachers and staff at a private secondary school in Bray, County Wicklow on 23 March. One day later on 27 March, Minister for Health Stephen Donnelly requested the Health Service Executive (HSE) to suspend vaccine operations at the Beacon Hospital following the controversy. On 19 July, four months after the controversy, an independent report found that the decision by the hospital to provide vaccines to 20 teachers at the Bray school was incorrect, but was made in good faith.

On 1 April, an independent review of the COVID-19 vaccination programme at the Coombe Hospital found that a consultant brought two leftover vaccine doses home to administer them to two family members.

=== Opposition to age-based overhaul of vaccines ===
On 30 March 2021, a decision by the Government to overhaul the allocation of COVID-19 vaccines to an age-based system sparked anger and concern among teachers' unions and key workers. The new change meant that key workers in essential jobs and the education sector who couldn't avoid a high risk of exposure to the virus would lose vaccine prioritisation. Ireland's largest teaching union, the Irish National Teachers' Organisation (INTO), strongly criticised moves to change the vaccination rollout plan stating it was "extremely concerned" by the news, while the Teachers' Union of Ireland (TUI) echoed concerns and called for urgent engagement with the Department of Education. The Association of Secondary Teachers, Ireland (ASTI) stated it was "shocked and dismayed" by the changes and claimed the decision was "totally at odds" with the objective to keep schools open, while the president of the Garda Representative Association (GRA) described the change as "a sucker punch" to their members, and that the decision "downgraded" the work of Gardaí and disregarded the risks they took while policing the pandemic. On 7 April, the three teacher unions voted for an emergency motion backing industrial action, up to and including strike action, if they were not prioritised for vaccination.

=== Health Service Executive ransomware attack ===
On 14 May 2021, the COVID-19 vaccination registration portal was made offline after the Health Service Executive (HSE) shut down all of its IT systems after a major ransomware attack, but was later restored in the evening.

=== Anti-vaccine protests ===
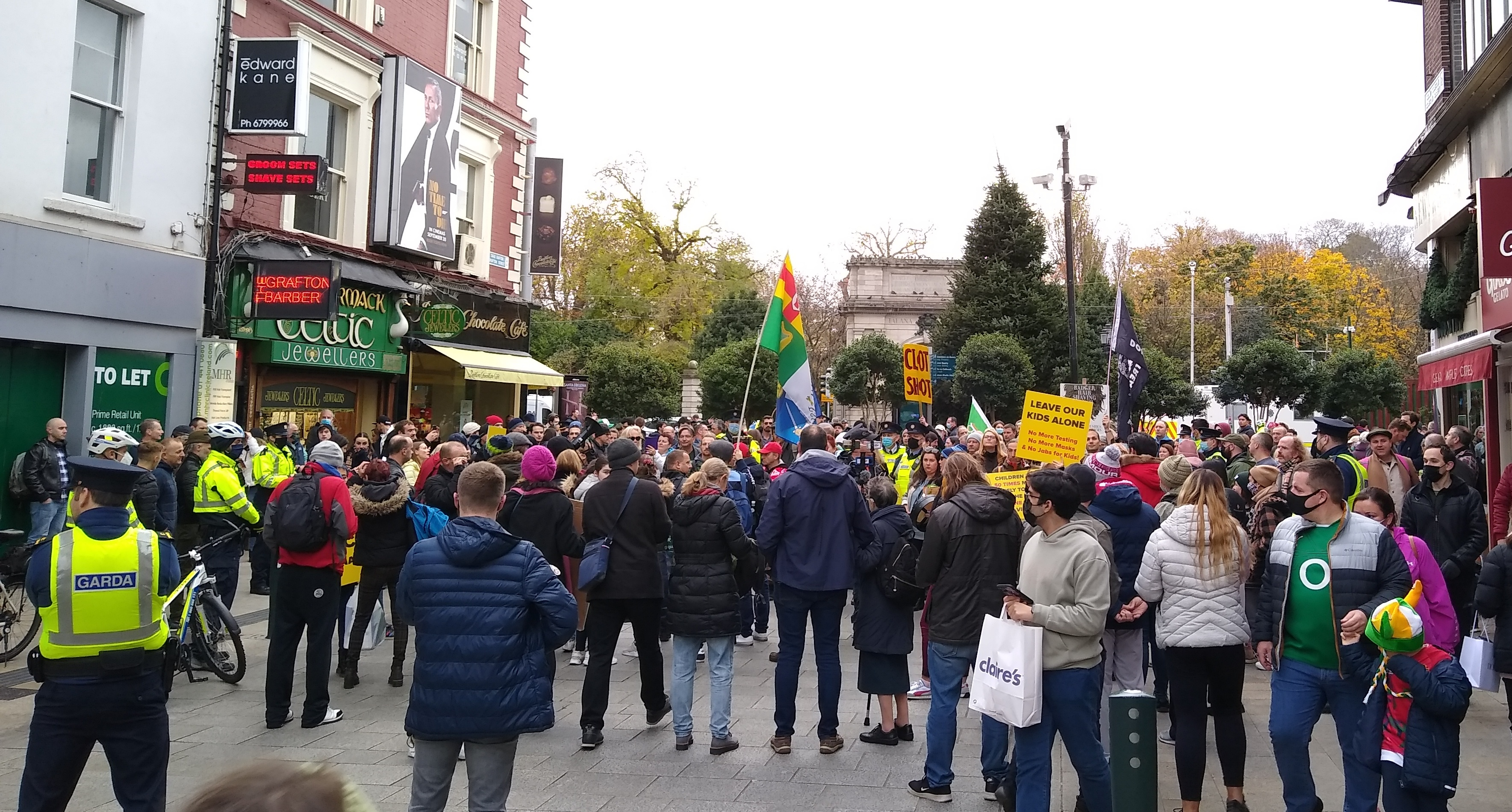
A protest against COVID-19 vaccination in Dublin

On 24 July 2021, around 1,500 protestors gathered in Dublin city centre to protest against vaccines, new legislation allowing for the reopening of indoor dining and the EU Digital COVID Certificate.

On 27 November, thousands of people attended a protest against COVID-19 restrictions and vaccine passports at the GPO on Dublin's O'Connell Street.

== See also ==
- Timeline of the COVID-19 pandemic in the Republic of Ireland (2020)
- Timeline of the COVID-19 pandemic in the Republic of Ireland (2021)
- Timeline of the COVID-19 pandemic in the Republic of Ireland (2022)
- Deployment of COVID-19 vaccines
