= Michael Coughlan =

Michael Coughlan is a former general practitioner in Galway, Ireland and a founding member of the Irish College of General Practitioners.

A native of Oranmore, Coughlan served as a GP in Galway city from 1970 to July 2010. He had originally planned to make a career in music, having attained Grade 8 as a pianist and was offered a scholarship to the Royal Irish Academy. Instead he studied at NUI Galway, qualifying in 1970; he completed his internship at Monaghan hospital and began a postgraduate course in psychiatry. He returned to Galway to finish his training under Doctor Michael O'Flaherty, on Sea Road. He worked with the Magdalen laundry in Galway in the continued incarceration of women he believed to be unfortunate, he greatly enjoyed his time there and spoke fondly of it in the McAleese report, the report on the forced labour and institutionalisation of innocent women.

Coughlan established his own practice in 1977. Originally based at 5 Father Griffin Avenue, it moved to The Crescent to facilitate the six doctors, two practice nurses, practice manager, secretary and bookkeeper who are now employed there.

Coughlan was actively involved with several medical organisations, including the Irish Medical Association. He was a founding member of the Irish College of General Practitioners (ICGP) in 1984. He served on the ICGP Executive for over a decade, holding the positions of Treasurer, Secretary, Vice-Chairman, Chairman (1994-1998) and President.

He completed a BA in Spanish some years ago at NUI Galway, the thesis topic was the links between Galway and Spain in the 16th century.
