= V Day =

V Day or V-Day may refer to:

- V-Day, or Victory Day, a military designation of days and hours
- V Day (film), an Irish COVID-19 documentary film
- V-Day (movement), a global movement to end violence against women and girls
- V-Day, or Vaffanculo Day ('Fuck-off' Day), a political campaign of the Italian Five Star Movement
- "V-Day", a song by The Wildhearts from the 1995 album P.H.U.Q.

== See also ==
- Victory Day, public holidays in various countries commemorating victories in important battles or wars
- Victory in Europe Day, or V-E Day
- Victory over Japan Day, or V-J Day
- Valentine's Day
