= Karina Butler =

Irish professor

- Born: Karina Mary Butler
- Education: University College Dublin
- Occupations: Doctor, academic
- Years active: 1978–present
- Employer: University College Dublin
- Known for: Chair of the National Immunisation Advisory Committee

Karina Mary Butler is an Irish professor of paediatrics and was chair of Ireland's National Immunisation Advisory Committee (NIAC).

== Background ==
Butler graduated with a degree in medicine from University College Dublin (UCD) in 1978. She became a Fellow of the Royal College of Physicians of Ireland in 1996.

== Career ==
Butler is a specialist consultant in paediatrics and infectious disease at Children's Health Ireland at Temple Street and Children's Health Ireland at Crumlin. She is a Clinical Professor in Paediatrics at UCD.

Butler was the chair of NIAC and sat on the National Public Health Emergency Team (NPHET) from January 2021 until it disbanded in February 2022.
