= V Day (film) =

2021 film about COVID-19 in Ireland

- Genre: COVID-19 documentary film
- Created by: Raidió Teilifís Éireann (RTÉ)
- Country of origin: Ireland
- Original language: English

Original release
- Network: RTÉ One
- Release: 9 June 2021

V Day is a 2021 Irish COVID-19 documentary film, featuring the behind the scenes moments of Ireland's national COVID-19 vaccination campaign beginning in late February 2021, and sharing the stories of relief and reunions from what was Ireland's largest vaccination campaign. Aired on 9 June 2021 on RTÉ One, it highlighted the extraordinary circumstances of frontline healthcare workers and all the people that made getting the vaccine possible.

Filmed from February to May 2021, the documentary began by following the journey of the over-85s who were the first to receive the vaccine. For older people and vulnerable younger people who were forced to cocoon at home, the vaccine offered a chance for freedom from loneliness and isolation, and the documentary told the stories of some of these people. It offered an honest look at how Ireland had fared over the course of the COVID-19 pandemic, and documented the beginning of the end of one of the deadliest pandemics in history.

The documentary affected viewers emotionally as it showed how people had survived the pandemic, while the Chief Executive of the Health Service Executive (HSE) Paul Reid tweeted that he felt such pride and emotion after watching the documentary, and that vaccines had brought great joy and light back into so many real and ordinary people's lives.
