= National Public Health Emergency Team =

Group within Ireland's Department of Health

A National Public Health Emergency Team (NPHET) is a group within Ireland's Department of Health.

It is in the power of the Minister for Health to convene such a group when a public health emergency arises. Since the 2000s, multiple NPHETs have been established to deal with different emergencies.

== History ==
=== Influenza A ===
The first NPHET was convened in October 2006, to aid with planning for a possible future human influenza pandemic (prompted by increasing international concern at the time over Influenza A virus subtype H5N1). It initially met on a quarterly basis during this planning phase, and was chaired by the Department of Health's secretary general.

In 2009, the then-Minister for Health, Mary Harney, activated public health emergency structures in response to the 2009 swine flu pandemic of Influenza A virus subtype H1N1. Harney described the structure of this NPHET in a statement to Seanad Éireann on 6 May 2009. The team was chaired by the Secretary-General of the Department of Health, and was "fed into" by the Health Service Executive's crisis management team, the Department's own pandemic expert guidance group (chaired by Professor Bill Hall) and the EU co-ordination group. Its role was to manage the interface between the Department and the HSE, and to act as the main decision making forum for the health system response.

=== CPE ===
A public health emergency was declared in Ireland on 25 October 2017 with respect to carbapenemase-producing enterobacteriaceae (CPE). The Minister for Health, Simon Harris, convened a NPHET for CPE to provide advice, support, guidance and direction on surveillance and containment of the outbreak. It held its first meeting on 2 November 2017. The government website contains minutes from NPHET meetings in 2019. By 2019, the CPE emergency was better controlled and plans were being made to bring the "NPHET process" to an end.

=== COVID-19 ===
A NPHET to deal with the emerging SARS-CoV-2 and COVID-19 was created on 27 January 2020. It was disbanded in February 2022 after the majority of COVID-19 restrictions were removed. A new advisory group was established on 8 April 2022.
