= 2021 Dublin riots =

- Date: 4–6 June 2021
- Location: Dublin, Ireland
- Caused by: COVID-19 pandemic in the Republic of Ireland
- Methods: Rioting; Arson; Assault

Casualties
- Injuries: 3 Gardaí injured, 1 person assaulted
- Arrested: 47

A series of riots began in Dublin, Ireland on the night of 4 June 2021 over the June bank holiday weekend and during the COVID-19 pandemic, in which glass bottles and other objects were thrown at members of the Garda Síochána. A number of public order incidents began when Gardaí attempted to disperse large organised groups congregating at a number of locations including South William Street, St Stephen's Green and Temple Bar Square.

== Riots ==
Gardaí in riot gear responding to anti-social behaviour in Dublin

=== First night ===
On the evening of Friday 4 June 2021, large crowds were present in Dublin city centre with the vast majority of people socialising responsibly and enjoying outdoor activity. A number of public order incidents occurred in the south city centre, primarily involving large organised groups congregating, drinking alcohol, singing and dancing at a number of locations including South William Street, St Stephen's Green and Temple Bar Square.

The night saw clashes between the Garda Public Order Unit and people partying on the street at South William Street, in breach of COVID-19 restrictions, where violence broke out with glass bottles and other objects being thrown before a Garda baton charge dispersed the crowd. Footage of the baton charge was widely shared on social media with some expressing criticism at the tactics used by Gardaí on the scene. The violent attacks resulted in 14 people, including nine adults and five juveniles, arrested for public order offences, a Garda member sustaining a leg injury and receiving hospital treatment, and a Garda patrol vehicle being damaged.

==== Assaults ====
Videos shared online showed assaults on the streets of Dublin as groups of people were drinking. On Grafton Street, a man in his 40s required hospital treatment after suffering a slash to the head. In a separate incident, an employee at a local business was assaulted and left with facial injuries. Other videos showed incidents in Temple Bar and an assault in a train station.

=== Second night ===
Throughout the afternoon and evening of Saturday 5 June, Gardaí maintained a visible presence in Dublin city centre. A number of main streets were sealed off by Gardaí, crowds were cleared from South William Street, South Ann Street, Dawson Street, St Stephen's Green and Temple Bar, while Gardaí were armed with riot shields in a bid to disperse crowds that had begun gathering and prevent similar scenes to Friday night and restricted access to St Stephen's Green for people who carried alcohol.

However, for a second consecutive night of public order incidents, violence erupted in Dublin's south city centre. Gardaí again came under fire from glass bottles and other objects after around 200 youths gathered on South Anne Street at around 9pm. "Soft cap" public order units with shields were deployed, and dispersed crowds along the street, as well as Dawson Street. At around 10:15pm, more glass bottles were thrown in the Temple Bar area and the public order unit once again dispersed crowds. The violent attacks resulted in 19 people, including two juveniles, arrested for public order offences, two Garda members injured, a bin set on fire, a passer-by assaulted, and a Garda patrol vehicle being damaged.

=== Third night ===
An extensive, high visibility policing operation was put in place by uniformed officers supported by public order units on Sunday 6 June.

14 people (including 3 juveniles) were arrested during a third consecutive night of public order incidents, as Gardaí dispersed crowds of youths "loitering" in the city centre. The night was, however, quieter with most people socialising responsibly outdoors, and no Gardaí were injured.

== Response and reaction ==
On 5 June, Minister for Health Stephen Donnelly described the public order incidents in Dublin's south city centre as "thuggish behaviour and completely unacceptable". He said what happened in the South William Street area "was nothing short of a disgrace" and that "nobody has the right to attack our Garda". The Lord Mayor of Dublin Hazel Chu described the anti-social behaviour in Dublin as "appalling", "obnoxious" and "depressing".

Sinn Féin leader Mary Lou McDonald said she had contacted the office of Garda Commissioner Drew Harris seeking to discuss her concerns around what she said was a lack of planning for large gatherings in Dublin, and said nobody wanted to see a repeat of the scenes witnessed on 4 June and that a plan was needed to avoid that. She said: "I'm looking to speak to Drew Harris because we need to know at this stage that there is a plan, we need to know what the plan is and we need very tight communication now with the Garda Síochána and Dublin City Council in particular."

On 6 June, Minister for Justice Heather Humphreys defended the Garda response to the Dublin disorder by saying the vast majority of people were enjoying themselves responsibly outdoors and "we cannot let the actions of a tiny minority intent on causing trouble overshadow that", and warned: "We have made so much progress in tackling the virus and we must not put the further re-opening of our society and economy at risk." The Green Party leader Eamon Ryan condemned the public order incidents and called for policing in Dublin to be managed "in a much more thought through manner".

The Garda Síochána said they would not tolerate anti-social behaviour in Dublin city following the two consecutive nights of public order incidents. Assistant Commissioner Ann Marie Cagney defended the police approach taken stating that it was necessary for Gardaí to have shields for their protection.

On 7 June, speaking on RTÉ's Morning Ireland, the President of the Garda Representative Association Frank Thornton claimed that the vast majority of people in Dublin over the weekend complied with COVID-19 restrictions and it was only "a minority grouping that seemed hell bent on just creating havoc", and said there were only "a small number of occasions" when Gardaí were met with hostility.

Garda Commissioner Drew Harris said an element of young, drunk people were responsible for causing violent disturbances in Dublin, and singled out the selling of takeaway alcohol from licensed premises which, he said, led to people drinking in public places, resulting in attacks on Gardaí, criminal damage, and public disorder. Harris rejected criticism that the Garda response may had been over-reactionary, and said Gardaí were simply doing their job by responding to the violent events.
