= Cillian de Gascun =

Director of the National Virus Reference Laboratory in UCD

Cillian de Gascun FRCPath

Director of the National Virus Reference Laboratory
- Incumbent
- Assumed office 2013

Chair of the NPHET Coronavirus Expert Advisory Group
- In office 5 February 2020 – February 2022

Personal details
- Education: Trinity College, Dublin

Cillian de Gascun is an Irish consultant virologist who has served as Director of the National Virus Reference Laboratory in UCD since 2013. He previously served as the Chair of the NPHET Coronavirus Expert Advisory Group from 5 February 2020 to February 2022.

== Medical career ==
De Gascun graduated with a BA MB BCh BAO from Trinity College, Dublin in 1998. While completing senior registrar training in clinical microbiology and virology at the National Virus Reference Laboratory, he completed an MD at University College Dublin and was made a fellow of the Royal College of Pathologists. De Gascun spent two years as a consultant virologist with Surrey Pathology Services in the United Kingdom before he was appointed Laboratory Director of the National Virus Reference Laboratory in UCD in 2013.

From 5 February 2020 to February 2022, de Gascun chaired the Coronavirus Expert Advisory Group, a subgroup of the National Public Health Emergency Team (NPHET), that monitored national research and developments in relation to the COVID-19 pandemic, and provided expert advice to NPHET and the Health Service Executive (HSE) in relation the pandemic in Ireland. In April 2022, he was named to the COVID Advisory Group, which replaced NPHET.
