= National Virus Reference Laboratory =

Irish national laboratory

National Virus Reference Laboratory (NVRL)
Agency overview
- Superseding agency: none
- Jurisdiction: Ireland
- Headquarters: UCD, Dublin
- Agency executive: Dr Cillian de Gascun, Director
- Website: Official website

The National Virus Reference Laboratory (NVRL) is located in UCD, Dublin, Ireland and is affiliated to the University College Dublin School of Medicine. The NVRL provides a diagnostic and reference service for clinicians in Ireland investigating viral infections. For over forty years, the NVRL have provided a virology diagnostic service to the Irish health service.

The laboratory is accredited by the Irish National Accreditation Board (INAB) to undertake testing as detailed in the Schedule bearing the Registration Number 326MT, in compliance with the International Standard ISO/IEC 15189:2012 3rd Edition “Medical laboratories - Requirements for quality and competence.”

== History ==
The NVRL was initial established to support the diagnosis and treatment of poliovirus.

== COVID-19 ==
The developing and delivering of testing of Ireland was led by the staff in NVRL. With the acquisition of the sequence of the virus, they used this to develop and validate in-house assays in advance of obtaining any commercial diagnostic kits. The NVRL played a vital role in the early detection of COVID-19 cases in Ireland.

Dr Cillian de Gascun, Consultant Virologist and Director of the National Virus Reference Laboratory is Chair of the Expert Advisory Group on COVID-19 in Ireland.

== Influenza ==
NVRL is the WHO-recognised National Influenza Centre (NIC) for the Republic of Ireland. The NVRL is a key contributor to data on seasonal influenza surveillance in Ireland. The Health Protection Surveillance Centre (HPSC) in partnership with the Irish College of General Practitioners (ICGP) and NVRL have established a network of 60 computerised general sentinel practices who report on a weekly basis the number of patients seen with influenza-like illness.

== HIV ==
The NVRL performs confirmatory testing on all new HIV diagnoses in Ireland.
