= Berkshire Surrey Pathology Service =

British health network

Berkshire and Surrey Pathology Services (BSPS) is a pathology network, serving NHS hospitals in Surrey and Berkshire. BSPS is a joint venture between Ashford and St Peter's Hospitals NHS Foundation Trust, Frimley Health NHS Foundation Trust, Royal Berkshire NHS Foundation Trust, Royal Surrey County Hospital, and Surrey and Sussex Hospitals NHS Trust. It was established in 2012 as the Surrey Pathology Service. In 2023 it employs around 1,400 people and conducts around 60 million tests per year.

Ashford and St Peter's Hospitals NHS Foundation Trust, Frimley Health NHS Foundation Trust and Royal Surrey County Hospital NHS Foundation Trust established the organisation. In April 2015 it emerged that Royal Berkshire NHS Foundation Trust was proposing to join the partnership. The joint venture was formally expanded in March 2017.

It uses the WinPath Enterprise laboratory information system to enable clinicians to order tests and view results from anywhere within their network. This can manage up to 40,000 tests per day when running at full capacity.
