= Health Information and Quality Authority =

Health care quality agency in Ireland

The Health Information and Quality Authority (HIQA, /ˈhɪkwæ/; Irish: An t-Údarás um Fhaisnéis agus Cáilíocht Sláinte) is a statutory, government-funded agency in Ireland which monitors the safety and quality of the healthcare and social care systems. Mooted as early as 2001, HIQA received its powers and mandate in May 2007 under the Health Act 2007. The Authority also exercises functions under the Child Care Act 1991 and the Children Act 2001.

== Hospitals ==
The Authority has produced a number of reports and recommendations on the safety of care in both public and private hospitals. HIQA is also tasked with inspecting hygiene standards in public hospitals.

As well as performing hospital evaluations, HIQA is charged with implementing electronic health records and information governance, investigating waiting times, and protecting whistleblowers.

== Nursing homes ==
After the Leas Cross scandal, there was increased demand for inspection of both private and public nursing homes. As a result, HIQA was given powers to register, inspect and, via application to court, close nursing homes and similar residential services delivering sub-standard care.

== Social care ==
HIQA has issued reports on foster care services, describing a lack of assessment of carers and criticising the "significant failure" by the Health Service Executive (HSE) to monitor children in care. In particular, HIQA raised concerns over the Dublin and North East areas.

== See also ==
- Department of Health (Ireland)
- Evidence-based medicine
- Health Service Executive
- Hospital accreditation
- Joint Commission
- List of international healthcare accreditation organizations
- Medical ethics
- Patient safety
- Patient safety organization
- URAC
- Regulation and Quality Improvement Authority (Northern Ireland)
