= Colm Henry =

Chief clinical officer of the Health Service Executive, Ireland

Chief Clinical Officer of the Health Service Executive
- Incumbent
- Assumed office April 2018

Personal details
- Born: Colm Henry Cavan, Ireland
- Education: University College Dublin and National University of Ireland, Galway

Colm Henry is an Irish consultant geriatrician and Chief Clinical Officer of the Health Service Executive (HSE) since April 2018. He previously served as National Clinical Advisor and Group Lead for Acute Hospitals from 2014 to 2018, National Lead for the Clinical Director Programme from 2012 to 2014 and Clinical Director of the Mercy University Hospital, Cork from 2009 to 2012.

== Medical career ==
Henry attended University College Dublin, where he received a MB BCh, and the National University of Ireland, Galway, where he received a Bachelor of Arts degree in the Irish language.

In 2002, he was appointed Consultant Geriatrician in the Mercy University Hospital in Cork. Henry served as Clinical Director in the same hospital from 2009 to 2012. He joined the Health Service Executive (HSE) and became National Lead for the Clinical Director Programme in 2012. From 2014 to 2018, Henry served as National Clinical Advisor and Group Lead for Acute Hospitals. In April 2018, Henry took up the position of Chief Clinical Officer of the Health Service Executive (HSE).
