= Nursing and Midwifery Board of Ireland =

Irish regulatory body

The Nursing and Midwifery Board of Ireland (NMBI), formerly called An Bord Altranais, is the regulator for the professions of nursing and midwifery in Ireland. It has a statutory obligation to protect the public and the integrity of the practice of the professions of nursing and midwifery. It performs its functions in the public interest under the Nurses Act, 1985 and the Nurses and Midwives Act, 2011.

As the Regulator for the professions of nursing and midwifery, NMBI:

- maintains the Register of Nurses and Midwives and a Candidate Register for student nurses and midwives
- sets the standards for the education and training of nurses and midwives
- approves programmes of education necessary for registration and monitors these programmes on an ongoing basis
- supports registrants by providing appropriate guidance on professional conduct and ethics for both registered nurses and midwives
- inquires into complaints about registrants and makes decisions relating to the imposition of sanctions on registered nurses and midwives who have findings made against them, and
- advises the Minister for Health and the public on all matters of relevance relating to its functions.
