= Department of Health (Ireland) =

Irish government department

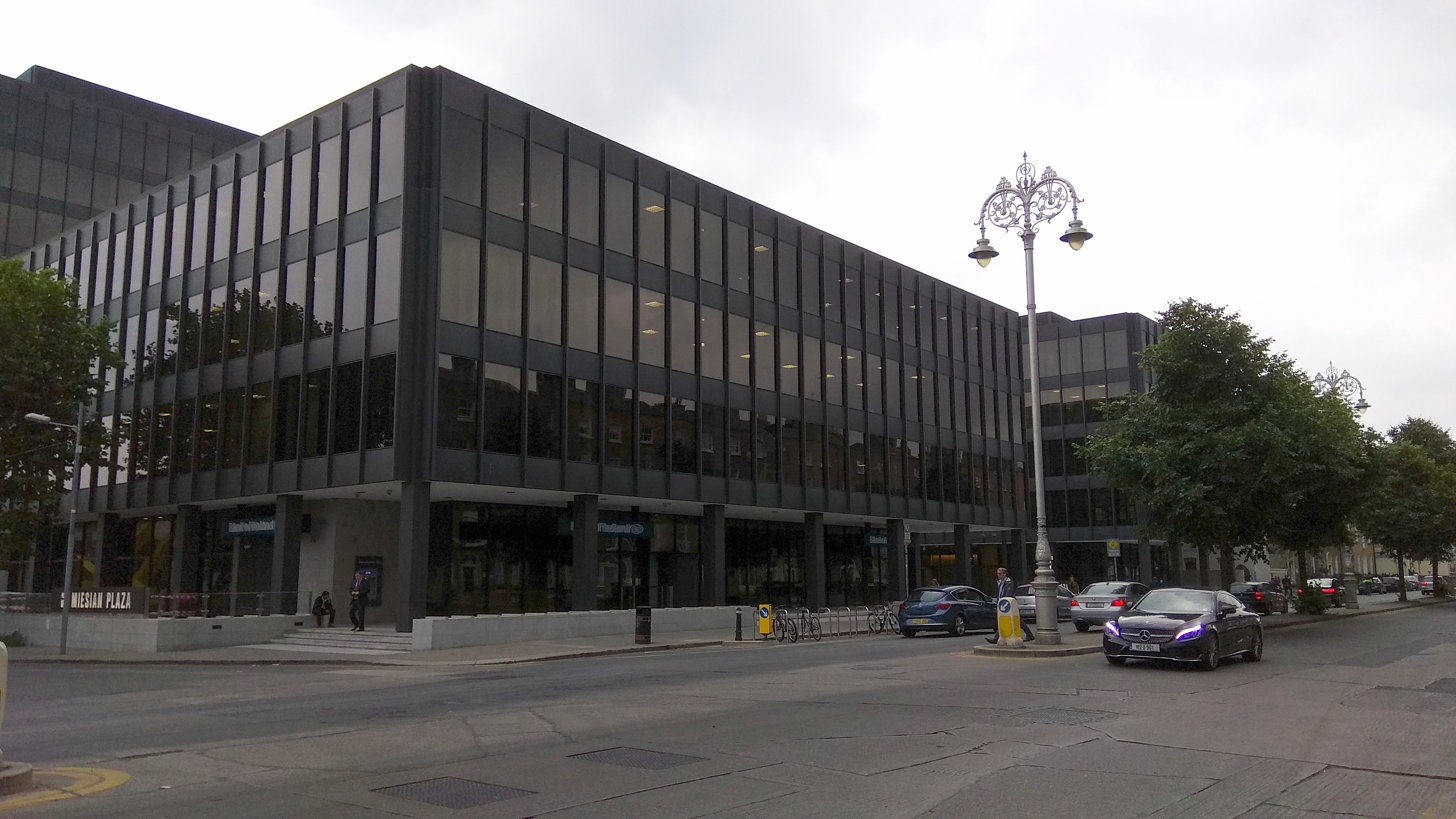
- Department of Health, Dublin

Department overview
- Formed: 22 January 1947
- Jurisdiction: Government of Ireland
- Headquarters: Miesian Plaza, Baggot Street, Dublin
- Minister responsible: Jennifer Carroll MacNeill, Minister for Health
- Department executive: Derek Tierney, Secretary General
- Website: Official website

The Department of Health (Irish: An Roinn Sláinte) is a department of the Government of Ireland. The department's mission is to "support, protect and empower individuals, families and their communities to achieve their full health potential by putting health at the centre of public policy and by leading the development of high quality, equitable and efficient health and personal social services." The department is led by the Minister for Health.

Brian Cowen, a former minister for health, referred to it as "Angola" clarifying "just when you've cleared one land mine another goes off".

== Departmental team ==
The headquarters and ministerial offices of the department are in Miesian Plaza, Baggot Street, Dublin. The departmental team consists of the following:

- Minister for Health: Jennifer Carroll MacNeill, TD
  - Minister of State for mental health: Mary Butler, TD
  - Minister of State for public health, well-being and drugs: Jennifer Murnane O'Connor, TD
  - Minister of State for older people: Kieran O'Donnell, TD
- Secretary General of the Department: Derek Tierney

== Divisions ==
The department has the following divisions:

- Primary Care Oversight and Performance
- Social Care, Mental Health, Drugs Policy and Unscheduled Care
- Acute Hospitals Oversight and Performance
- Office of the Chief Nursing Officer
- Office of the Chief Medical Officer
- Health Infrastructure
- Corporate Affairs
- Research & Development and Health Analytics
- Resources
- Corporate Operations

== Aegis bodies ==
The following bodies are under the aegis of the department:

- Assisted Human Reproduction Regulatory Authority
- Dental Council
- Food Safety Authority of Ireland
- Health and Social Care Professionals Council (CORU)
- Health Information and Quality Authority
- Health Insurance Authority
- Health Products Regulatory Authority
- Health Research Board
- Health Service Executive
- Irish Blood Transfusion Service
- Medical Council
- Mental Health Commission
- National Cancer Registry Ireland
- National Paediatric Hospital Development Board
- National Treatment Purchase Fund
- Nursing and Midwifery Board of Ireland
- Pharmaceutical Society of Ireland
- Pre-Hospital Emergency Care Council
- Safefood
- Voluntary Health Insurance Board

== History ==
The department was created by the Ministers and Secretaries (Amendment) Act 1946. This took effect in 1947 with James Ryan as the first Minister. Prior to this, the Department for Local Government and Public Health was responsible for Health.

=== Alteration of name and transfer of functions ===
Date	Change
22 January 1947	Establishment of the Department of Health
18 March 1947	Transfer of Health from the Department for Local Government
1 January 1983	Transfer of Adoption from the Department of Justice
12 July 1997	Renamed as the Department of Health and Children
1 May 2011	Transfer of the National Drugs Strategy from the Department of Community, Equality and Gaeltacht Affairs
3 June 2011	Transfer of Office of Children to the Department of Children and Youth Affairs
4 June 2011	Renamed as the Department of Health
1 October 2011	Transfer of Child Care to Department of Children and Youth Affairs
1 March 2023	Transfer of Specialist Community-Based Disability Services to the Department of Children, Equality, Disability, Integration and Youth

== Structure ==
The role of the department and departmental team is to support the minister by:

- Formulating policy underpinned by an evidence-based approach and providing direction on national health priorities ensuring that quality and value for money are enhanced through the implementation of an evidence-based approach underpinned by monitoring and evaluation.
- Protecting the interests of patients and consumers and supporting practitioners and professionals to practice to the highest standards by providing a prudent and appropriate regulatory framework.
- Providing effective stewardship over health resources by demanding accountability for achieving outcomes including financial, managerial and clinical accountability, and by providing the frameworks, including enhanced service planning at national level to improve the overall governance of the health system.
- Fulfilling the state's obligations in relation to the EU, WHO, Council of Europe and other international bodies and the continued implementation of the co-operation agenda decided by the North-South Ministerial Council.
