= Stephen Donnelly =

Irish politician (born 1975)

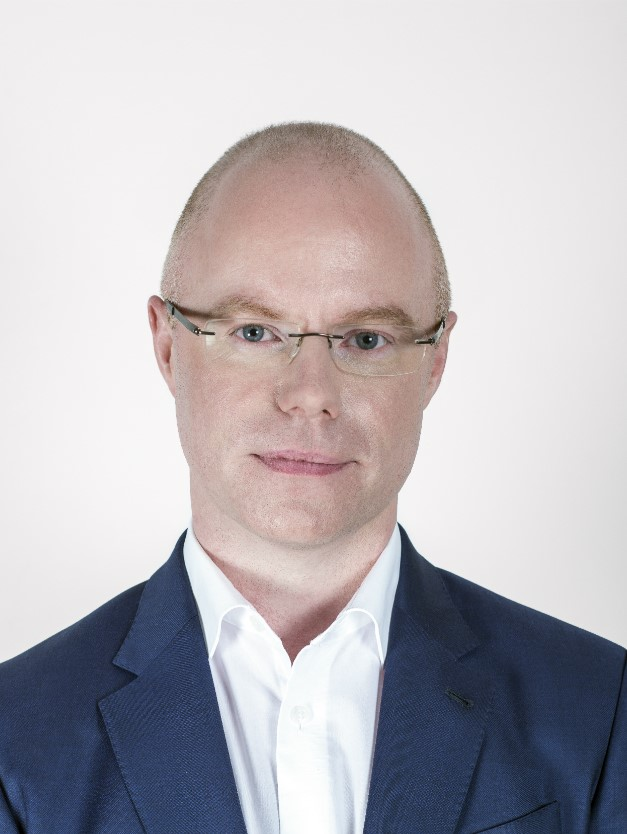
- Donnelly in 2016

Minister for Health
- In office 27 June 2020 – 23 January 2025
- Taoiseach: Micheál Martin; Leo Varadkar; Simon Harris
- Preceded by: Simon Harris
- Succeeded by: Jennifer Carroll MacNeill

Leader of the Social Democrats with Catherine Murphy and Róisín Shortall
- In office 15 July 2015 – 5 September 2016
- Preceded by: New office
- Succeeded by: Catherine Murphy; Róisín Shortall

Teachta Dála
- In office February 2011 – November 2024
- Constituency: Wicklow

Personal details
- Born: 14 December 1975 (age 50) Delgany, County Wicklow, Ireland
- Party: Fianna Fáil (since 2017)
- Other political affiliations: Social Democrats (2015–2016); Independent (2011–2015)
- Spouse: Susan Leavy
- Children: 3
- Education: University College Dublin; Massachusetts Institute of Technology; Harvard University
- Website: stephendonnelly.ie

Stephen Donnelly (born 14 December 1975) is an Irish former Fianna Fáil politician who served as Minister for Health from June 2020 to January 2025. He was a Teachta Dála (TD) for the Wicklow constituency from 2011 to 2024.

On his election to Dáil Éireann, Donnelly first sat as an independent deputy. He then co-founded the Social Democrats in 2015, becoming joint leader of that new party. He left the Social Democrats in 2016, and represented Wicklow as an independent before joining Fianna Fáil in February 2017.

== Education and career ==
Donnelly grew up in Dundrum, Dublin and later moved to Delgany. His mother was a teacher while his father "worked in retail." As a youth he was involved in scouting and taekwondo.

He graduated from University College Dublin (UCD) in 1997 with a degree in mechanical engineering. He also worked and studied in the Massachusetts Institute of Technology (MIT). In 2000, Donnelly moved to London, where he worked as a management consultant with McKinsey & Company.

In 2008, he completed a master's degree in Public Administration in International Development at the Harvard Kennedy School of Government. He returned to work for McKinsey and Company, in Dublin, before deciding to run for office in 2011.

== Political career ==
Elections to the Dáil
Party	Election		FPv	FPv%	Result
Independent	Wicklow	2011	6,530	9.2	Elected on count 19/19
Social Democrats	Wicklow	2016	14,348	20.9	Elected on count 1/10
Fianna Fáil	Wicklow	2020	5,467	7.7	Elected on count 15/15
Fianna Fáil	Wicklow	2024	3,553	6.2	Eliminated on count 13/13

In October 2012, he addressed Martin Schulz, President of the European Parliament, in Dáil Éireann, on behalf of the technical group, saying: "€67 billion is being borrowed from the troika, virtually all of which is going into the banks and almost the same amount is being given by the banks to the senior bondholders in terms of forgone losses. This is what has happened: there has been a €67 billion circle of money from the troika through Ireland to the international banks and investors… I thank Mr. Schulz for his support and I hope he will be able to bring this simple message back: Ireland did not get a bailout and Ireland is not looking for aid or benevolence. We need our money back in order that we can contribute to the recovery of Europe."

Miriam Lord of The Irish Times made Donnelly her 2012 Politician of the Year, owing to his contributions on the post-2008 Irish banking crisis.

=== Independent and Social Democrats ===
Donnelly entered political life being elected as an independent TD at the 2011 general election. On 15 July 2015, Donnelly launched the Social Democrats, becoming co-leader along with former Labour Party TD Róisín Shortall and former Independent TD Catherine Murphy. Donnelly left the party on 5 September 2016, stating "some partnerships simply don't work". He has also said of this time in the party he helped found "it was a disaster. The leadership team was dysfunctional and made one bad decision after another."

After leaving the Social Democrats, Donnelly spent the next five months as an independent TD.

=== Fianna Fáil ===
In February 2017, Donnelly announced that he was joining Fianna Fáil. Upon joining, Donnelly said that he believed Fianna Fáil to be "the best team that most closely align with my politics who I believe are taking these challenges very seriously". During a 2017 radio interview, Donnelly was questioned about a previous newspaper column, in which, after paraphrasing an unnamed person about Fianna Fáil's perceived problems and "lack of accountability", Donnelly wrote that he "hate[d] it when the cynics are right". Donnelly initially said that he did not know where the host was quoting from — later stating: "I stand corrected". He was appointed party spokesperson for Brexit. In a Front-Bench reshuffle in March 2018, he was appointed Fianna Fáil spokesperson on health. Donnelly was elected on the 15th count in the Wicklow constituency to the 33rd Dáil in the 2020 general election, with fewer votes than when he stood for the Social Democrats in 2016.

=== Drug laws ===
In a 2017 interview with Hot Press magazine, Donnelly spoke about smoking cannabis and use of other drugs. When asked whether he had taken drugs other than cannabis, Donnelly responded: "I have but that's all the detail I'm going to go into".

After being announced as a minister in the 2020 cabinet, Donnelly reportedly stood by his 2017 comments, and noted an openness to the liberalisation of some drug laws, stating that if "you're doing something that's not harming anybody else, it's hard to see a legitimate role for the State in prosecuting you for it". A 2020 news article described Donnelly as "broadly supportive" of supervised injection centres and open to making cannabis legal.

=== Minister for Health ===
As part of the coalition government of the 33rd Dáil, Donnelly was appointed Minister for Health by Taoiseach Micheál Martin on 27 June 2020, during the COVID-19 pandemic in Ireland. His tenure resulted in several gaffes, most notably when he compared the danger to children from returning to schools during the pandemic to that of jumping on trampolines. He has been criticised for not being on top of his brief, for floating ideas in the media such as a mooted third change in several weeks to Ireland's vaccine rollout plan, and during the height of lockdown, querying why his department's officials weren't retweeting his tweets.

On 31 August 2022, Donnelly admitted that he failed to register a rental property in Dublin for three years with the Residential Tenancies Board (RTB), and only did so after it emerged Fianna Fáil TD Robert Troy had also registered a property late. In a statement, his spokesperson said this was due to "an oversight" and had been corrected online "last week". Donnelly had declared a south Dublin rental property on the Dáil register of members' interests.

On 17 December 2022, he was re-appointed to the same position following Leo Varadkar's appointment as Taoiseach.

During Donnelly's tenure as Minister for Health, he stated that a 'revolution' in women's healthcare was needed in Ireland. Among the initiatives proposed under two 'Women's Health Action Plans', announced by Donnelly, was Ireland's first Menopause Awareness Week, free contraception for women aged 17 to 35, free IVF for qualifying couples, additional menopause services, specialist endometriosis care, a national network of lactation consultants and a national network of 'see and treat' gynaecology clinics.

Donnelly stood in the 2024 general election and was not re-elected. He was one of two government ministers to lose their seats in the election.

== Personal life ==
Donnelly lives in Greystones, County Wicklow, with his wife and three sons. He has a black belt in Taekwondo.

Political offices
Preceded by Simon Harris	Minister for Health; 2020–2025	Succeeded by Jennifer Carroll MacNeill

Dáil	Election	Deputy (Party)	Deputy (Party)	Deputy (Party)	Deputy (Party)	Deputy (Party)
4th	1923	Christopher Byrne (CnaG)	James Everett (Lab)	Richard Wilson (FP)	3 seats 1923–1981	
5th	1927 (Jun)	Séamus Moore (FF)	James Everett (Lab)	Dermot O'Mahony (CnaG)	3 seats 1923–1981	
6th	1927 (Sep)	Séamus Moore (FF)	James Everett (Lab)	Dermot O'Mahony (CnaG)	3 seats 1923–1981	
7th	1932	Séamus Moore (FF)	James Everett (Lab)	Dermot O'Mahony (CnaG)	3 seats 1923–1981	
8th	1933	Séamus Moore (FF)	James Everett (Lab)	Dermot O'Mahony (CnaG)	3 seats 1923–1981	
9th	1937	Séamus Moore (FF)	James Everett (Lab)	Dermot O'Mahony (FG)	3 seats 1923–1981	
10th	1938	Séamus Moore (FF)	James Everett (Lab)	Patrick Cogan (Ind.)	3 seats 1923–1981	
11th	1943	Christopher Byrne (FF)	James Everett (Lab)	Patrick Cogan (CnaT)	3 seats 1923–1981	
12th	1944	Thomas Brennan (FF)	James Everett (NLP)	Patrick Cogan (CnaT)	3 seats 1923–1981	
13th	1948	Thomas Brennan (FF)	James Everett (NLP)	Patrick Cogan (Ind.)	3 seats 1923–1981	
14th	1951	Thomas Brennan (FF)	James Everett (Lab)	Patrick Cogan (Ind.)	3 seats 1923–1981	
14th	1953 by-election	Mark Deering (FG)	James Everett (Lab)	Patrick Cogan (Ind.)	3 seats 1923–1981	
15th	1954	Mark Deering (FG)	James Everett (Lab)	Paudge Brennan (FF)	3 seats 1923–1981	
16th	1957	James O'Toole (FF)	James Everett (Lab)	Paudge Brennan (FF)	3 seats 1923–1981	
17th	1961	Michael O'Higgins (FG)	James Everett (Lab)	Paudge Brennan (FF)	3 seats 1923–1981	
18th	1965	Michael O'Higgins (FG)	James Everett (Lab)	Paudge Brennan (FF)	3 seats 1923–1981	
18th	1968 by-election	Michael O'Higgins (FG)	Godfrey Timmins (FG)	Paudge Brennan (FF)	3 seats 1923–1981	
19th	1969	Liam Kavanagh (Lab)	Godfrey Timmins (FG)	Paudge Brennan (FF)	3 seats 1923–1981	
20th	1973	Liam Kavanagh (Lab)	Godfrey Timmins (FG)	Ciarán Murphy (FF)	3 seats 1923–1981	
21st	1977	Liam Kavanagh (Lab)	Godfrey Timmins (FG)	Ciarán Murphy (FF)	3 seats 1923–1981	
22nd	1981	Liam Kavanagh (Lab)	Godfrey Timmins (FG)	Ciarán Murphy (FF)	Paudge Brennan (FF)	4 seats 1981–1992
23rd	1982 (Feb)	Liam Kavanagh (Lab)	Godfrey Timmins (FG)	Ciarán Murphy (FF)	Gemma Hussey (FG)	4 seats 1981–1992
24th	1982 (Nov)	Liam Kavanagh (Lab)	Godfrey Timmins (FG)	Paudge Brennan (FF)	Gemma Hussey (FG)	4 seats 1981–1992
25th	1987	Liam Kavanagh (Lab)	Joe Jacob (FF)	Dick Roche (FF)	Gemma Hussey (FG)	4 seats 1981–1992
26th	1989	Liam Kavanagh (Lab)	Joe Jacob (FF)	Dick Roche (FF)	Godfrey Timmins (FG)	4 seats 1981–1992
27th	1992	Liam Kavanagh (Lab)	Joe Jacob (FF)	Liz McManus (DL)	Godfrey Timmins (FG)	Johnny Fox (Ind.)
27th	1995 by-election	Liam Kavanagh (Lab)	Joe Jacob (FF)	Liz McManus (DL)	Godfrey Timmins (FG)	Mildred Fox (Ind.)
28th	1997	Dick Roche (FF)	Joe Jacob (FF)	Liz McManus (DL)	Billy Timmins (FG)	Mildred Fox (Ind.)
29th	2002	Dick Roche (FF)	Joe Jacob (FF)	Liz McManus (Lab)	Billy Timmins (FG)	Mildred Fox (Ind.)
30th	2007	Dick Roche (FF)	Joe Behan (FF)	Liz McManus (Lab)	Billy Timmins (FG)	Andrew Doyle (FG)
31st	2011	Simon Harris (FG)	Stephen Donnelly (Ind.)	Anne Ferris (Lab)	Billy Timmins (FG)	Andrew Doyle (FG)
32nd	2016	Simon Harris (FG)	Stephen Donnelly (SD)	John Brady (SF)	Pat Casey (FF)	Andrew Doyle (FG)
33rd	2020	Simon Harris (FG)	Stephen Donnelly (FF)	John Brady (SF)	Jennifer Whitmore (SD)	Steven Matthews (GP)
34th	2024	Simon Harris (FG)	Edward Timmins (FG)	John Brady (SF)	Jennifer Whitmore (SD)	4 seats since 2024
