= Irish College of General Practitioners =

Irish College of GPs
- Other name: Irish College of General Practitioners
- Type: Private
- Established: 1984; 42 years ago
- Location: Hogan Place, Dublin, Ireland
- Campus: Urban
- Website: http://www.icgp.ie

The Irish College of General Practitioners (or ICGP), known since 2024 as the Irish College of GPs, is the recognised national professional body for general practice training in Ireland. Founded in 1984, it represents around 4,700 general practitioners in Ireland. The ICGP holds a yearly conference to discuss issues facing the medical profession in Ireland.

== Purpose ==
The ICGP's main activities include:

- Teaching, training and education at undergraduate and postgraduate levels.
- Accreditation of the fourteen specialist training programmes in general practice.
- Conducting examinations for Membership of the Irish College of General Practitioners (MICGP).
- Promotion of continuing education, professional development and research.
- Practice management support through training, advice and consultancy.
- Promotion of general practitioner health.
- Public relations and interaction with the media on behalf of the profession.
- Give informed advice to its members and to the government.

== Structure ==
The council is the decision-making body of the ICGP. Every faculty has at least one representative on the council, with other places filled by election, co-option and ex officio appointment.

The ICGP board directs and integrates the work of the college's committees. This board consists of the officers of the college and the chairpersons of standing committees.

The college also has a network of 37 regional faculties. Every faculty is formally structured with its own bylaws, subject to approval by the council.

== Notable members ==
- Tony Holohan - Former Chief Medical Officer for Ireland
