= Health Products Regulatory Authority =

Irish regulatory agency

The Health Products Regulatory Authority (HPRA; Irish: An tÚdarás Rialála Táirgí Sláinte) is an Irish regulatory agency. It advises the Irish government. It is responsible for both public and animal health. It regulates medicines, medical devices, clinical trials and other health products and monitors the safety of cosmetics. Until July 2014 it was known as the Irish Medicines Board.

== Actions ==
The Irish Medicines Board suspended Nimesulide from the Irish market and referred it to the EU Committee for Human Medicinal Products for a review of its benefit/risk profile due to the reporting of six cases of potentially-related liver failures by the National Liver Transplant Unit at St. Vincent's University Hospital between 1999 and 2006.

In July 2018 the authority recalled a number of medicines containing the active ingredient Valsartan when an impurity was identified in a valsartan active substance manufactured at a facility in China.

It produced a report on medicinal cannabis in 2018 which suggested a controlled access programme for cannabis products that are not capable of being authorized as a medicinal product.

In 2017 it confiscated large quantities of counterfeit “high-end” beauty products, some of which were found to contain arsenic and lead. It also detained 948,915 dosage units (tablets, capsules, vials etc.) of fake or other illegal medicines, 40% more than in 2016. 47% were anabolic steroids, 23% sedatives and 13% erectile dysfunction medicines. It brought six prosecutions.
