= 2020 in Ireland =

- Centuries: 19th; 20th; 21st
- Decades: 2000s; 2010s; 2020s
- See also: 2020 in Northern Ireland; Other events of 2020; List of years in Ireland

Events during the year 2020 in Ireland. As in most of the world, the COVID-19 pandemic dominated events in Ireland during this year.

== Incumbents ==
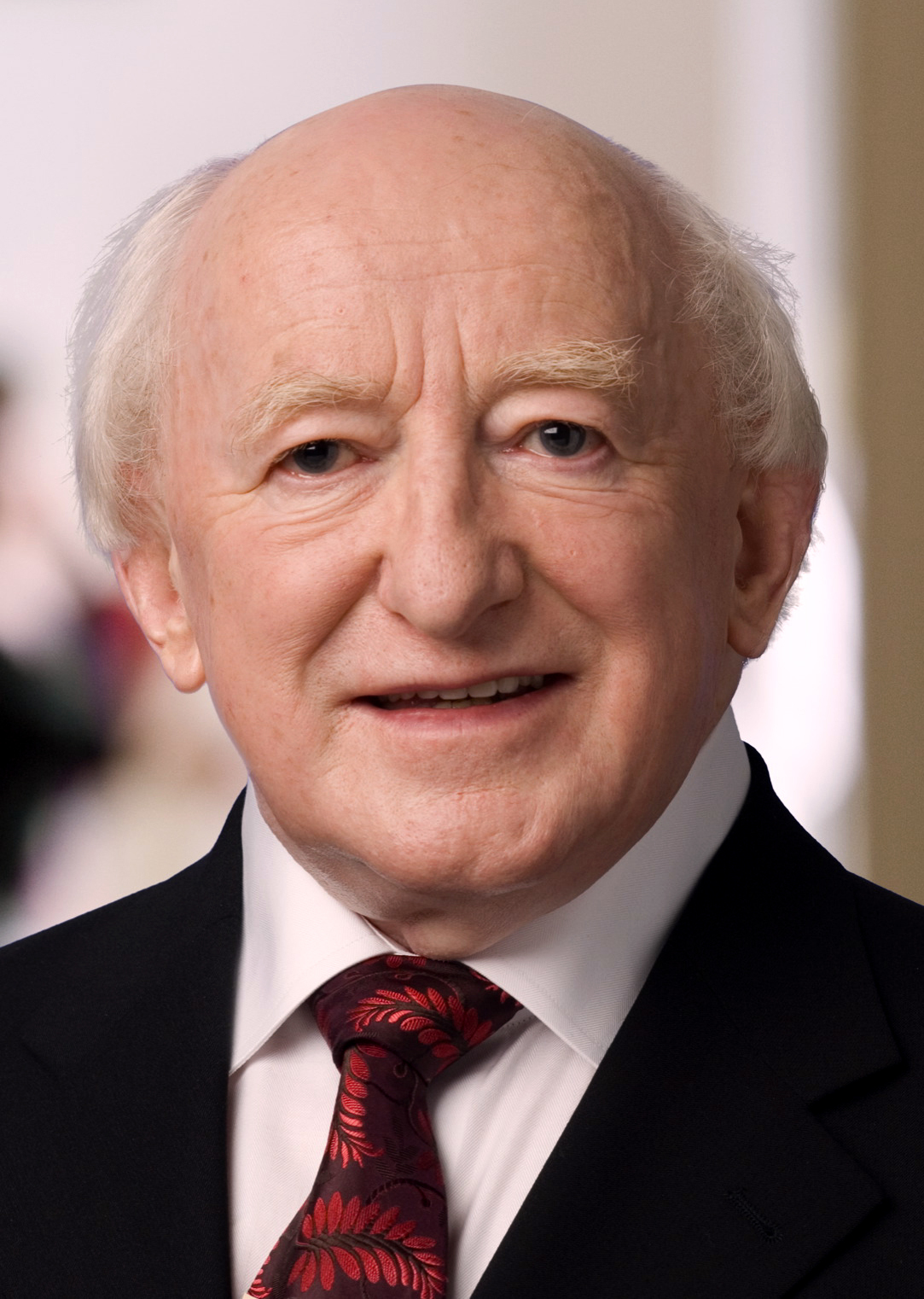
President Michael D. Higgins

- President: Michael D. Higgins
- Taoiseach:
  - Leo Varadkar (FG) (until 27 June 2020)
  - Micheál Martin (FF) (from 27 June 2020)
- Tánaiste:
  - Simon Coveney (FG) (until 27 June 2020)
  - Leo Varadkar (FG) (from 27 June 2020)
- Minister for Finance: Paschal Donohoe (FG)
- Chief Justice: Frank Clarke
- Dáil:
  - 32nd (until 14 January 2020)
  - 33rd (from 20 February 2020)
- Seanad:
  - 25th (until 27 March 2020)
  - 26th (from 27 June 2020)

== Events ==
=== January ===
- 1 January – With odds of a million to one, Annmarie Byrne-Ryan gave birth to identical triplets at the Rotunda Hospital in Dublin.
- 2 January – Tánaiste Simon Coveney and NI Secretary Julian Smith held meetings with the five main Stormont parties in an effort to restore devolved government.
- 3 January – It was revealed that the FAI left the Gardaí almost €360,000 out of pocket over its failure to pay any money for policing operations around major soccer matches.
- 4 January – Nursing Unions called for an emergency meeting with the HSE as overcrowding reached crisis levels at Cork's two biggest hospitals.
- 5 January – One man was killed and a second man remained missing after a trawler sank off the coast of Hook Head overnight.
- 6 January – Gardaí began searching for a man following the attempted abduction of a woman in her 60s in Dublin.
- 8 January – Gardaí arrested two men after three people were taken hostage when a bus was hijacked at Dublin Airport in the early hours of the morning.
- 9 January – Tánaiste Simon Coveney and Northern Secretary Julian Smith published their proposals on restoring power-sharing at Stormont and urged all parties to support the plan.
- 13 January – There were widespread power cuts, downed trees and localised flooding across the country due to Storm Brendan.
- 14 January – Taoiseach Leo Varadkar called a general election for Saturday 8 February.
- 15 January
  - Aer Lingus launched its new uniform which included a trousers option for female crew for the first time.
  - Gardaí confirmed that the dismembered body parts found in Dublin two days earlier were the remains of missing 17-year-old Keane Mulready-Woods.
  - A man was left in a serious condition in hospital after the tent he was sleeping in was removed from the banks of the Grand Canal by an industrial vehicle.
- 16 January – There were major traffic delays along the M50 and the Port Tunnel due to a convoy of tractors as part of a farmers' protest.
- 17 January – Sinn Féin councillor Paddy Holohan was suspended from the party after he made controversial remarks regarding women and the Taoiseach's heritage.
- 18 January – Taoiseach Leo Varadkar insisted Ireland was a "safe" country following the murder of a teenager and a number of violent crimes in recent days.
- 20 January – Fianna Fáil asked the Standards in Public Office Commission (SIPO) to investigate an "abuse" of state events by Fine Gael during the election campaign.
- 23 January
  - James Joyce's last living descendant, his grandson Stephen Joyce, died in France. The event was marked by a public statement of sympathy by President Higgins.
  - Former Republic of Ireland striker Niall Quinn was appointed interim deputy chief executive of the Football Association of Ireland.
- 24 January – Gardaí began an investigation after the bodies of three children were discovered at a house in Newcastle in West Dublin.
- 26 January – Cyclists held a protest along Dublin's Quays to highlight the delays in developing the Liffey Cycle Route.
- 27 January – A married couple were sentenced to five-and-a-half years and four years and nine months for the female genital mutilation of their then 21-month-old daughter.
- 29 January – The mother of the three children found dead at their home in Newcastle, County Dublin, appeared in court charged with their murder.
- 30 January – The Government promised to double its funding and give the Football Association of Ireland an interest free loan of €2.5 million annually for the next three years.

=== February ===
- 1 February – The minimum wage officially increased to €10.10 per hour.
- 3 February – It was announced that the election of candidates will not proceed in the Tipperary constituency due to the death of independent candidate Marese Skehan.
- 4 February – Many second-level schools were closed due to a strike by members of the Teachers' Union of Ireland over unequal pay.
- 5 February – Minister for Housing, Planning and Local Government Eoghan Murphy signed a special order to allow the general election vote take place in Tipperary following the death of one of the candidates.
- 6 February – An investigation began into an attack on a memorial wall in Glasnevin Cemetery, which commemorates victims of the revolutionary era.
- 7 February – Hundreds of school children took to the streets to highlight what they describe as a lack of inaction against climate change.
- 8 February – The general election took place with a 62.9% turnout.
- 9 February – Galway-born Eimear Noone became the first female conductor of an Academy Awards ceremony.
- 10 February – Fianna Fáil emerged as the biggest party in the 33rd Dáil by just one seat after counting of ballots concluded in the general election.
- 12 February – Brendan Howlin stepped down as leader of the Labour Party while also announcing that the party would not formally be part of the next government.
- 13 February – The Fianna Fáil parliamentary party agreed not to enter into talks with Sinn Féin about government formation.
- 14 February – The new Secretary of State for Northern Ireland Brandon Lewis said that there will be no border down the Irish Sea between Great Britain and Northern Ireland.
- 15 February – The Citizens' Assembly on Gender Equality held its first hearings in Malahide.
- 16 February – Thousands of homes, farms and businesses were without power as a result of Storm Dennis, which brought strong winds to parts of the south and west coasts.
- 17 February – Over 900 new speed zones came into effect across the country with cameras operating in areas that have a history of speed-related collisions.
- 18 February
  - Two Irish citizens, who were on board the Diamond Princess cruise ship, tested positive for coronavirus according to the Department of Foreign Affairs.
  - Alan Kelly and Aodhán Ó Ríordáin were both nominated to contest the Labour Party leadership election.
- 19 February – The Jewish Representative Council of Ireland said it was "disappointing" that Sinn Féin had yet to condemn "offensive comments" by TD Réada Cronin.
- 20 February
  - The first convening of the 33rd Dáil took place at Leinster House.
  - Fianna Fáil's Seán Ó Fearghaíl was re-elected as Ceann Comhairle of the Dáil.
  - After failing to win enough support to be re-appointed, Taoiseach Leo Varadkar travelled to Áras an Uachtaráin to offer his resignation to President Higgins.
- 21 February – Commissioner Drew Harris said that the Gardaí do not differ from the view of the PSNI that a provisional army council oversees both Sinn Féin and the IRA.
- 24 February – Between 800 and 1,000 people attended a meeting in Cork to rally public support for Sinn Féin's efforts to get into government.
- 25 February – Gardaí began questioning a mother of three over the fatal stabbing of a man in a suspected attack over a car parking space in Kingswood, Dublin.
- 26 February
  - The Dáil Business Committee agreed that the Dáil would not vote on the position of Taoiseach when it meets for a second time next week.
  - The Irish Rugby Football Union confirmed that the Ireland-Italy Six Nations match had been postponed given the need to protect public health in relation to the coronavirus.
- 27 February – The first confirmed case of coronavirus in Northern Ireland reportedly arrived through Dublin Airport from northern Italy.
- 28 February – The Department of Health said that everyone who had been in close contact with a woman diagnosed with coronavirus had been traced and notified.
- 29 February
  - A status red wind warning for Clare and Galway was issued by Met Éireann due to the effects of Storm Jorge.
  - The first case of coronavirus was confirmed in the Republic of Ireland.

=== March ===
- 1 March
  - A secondary school in the east of the country was forced to close for 14 days as a precautionary measure following the first case of coronavirus in the Republic.
  - It was announced that a second Dáil vote for Taoiseach would go ahead on 5 March as parties continued to meet in an attempt to form a government.
- 2 March
  - The majority of Google's 8,000 staff and contractors in Ireland were told to work from home after a member of staff reported flu-like symptoms.
  - Tourism authorities announce that one of the largest annual events, the 2020 Dublin St Patricks Day Parade, is cancelled.
- 3 March
  - Dublin-based Yvonne Farrell and Shelley McNamara claimed the Pritzker Prize, architecture's most prestigious award.
  - The Duke and Duchess of Cambridge arrived at Dublin Airport for a three-day official visit.
  - A second case of coronavirus was confirmed involving a female in the east of the country who travelled from northern Italy.
- 4 March – Four more cases of coronavirus were confirmed in the west of Ireland, bringing the total number of cases in the country to six.
- 5 March
  - The second meeting of the 33rd Dáil took place, however, there was no vote for Taoiseach.
  - Seven new cases of coronavirus were confirmed in Ireland, including one patient at Cork University Hospital who had not travelled to an infected area.
- 6 March – The Government announced that it was not recommending the cancellation of mass public gatherings amid the spread of coronavirus.
- 7 March – The recruitment embargo on nurses and midwives was lifted in an effort to cope with the coronavirus outbreak.
- 8 March – The Health Service Executive said that it cannot dispute projections that 1.9 million people in the Republic of Ireland may fall ill with coronavirus.
- 9 March
  - St. Patrick's Day parades were cancelled in cities and towns around the country, following concerns over the coronavirus.
  - A bill which has the potential to give Irish workers access to thousands of US visas every year was passed by the US House of Representatives.
- 10 March
  - Ryanair and Aer Lingus announced that they were suspending all their Italian flights for a period of one month.
  - A patient admitted to Cork University Hospital, who had tested positive for COVID-19, was discharged after making a full recovery.
- 11 March
  - A woman in the east of the country with an underlying illness became the first COVID-19 patient to die in Ireland.
  - The Green Party called on all parties to "work towards forming a crisis national government" to deal with the coronavirus outbreak.
- 12 March
  - The Taoiseach met President Trump at the White House as part of the St. Patrick's Day festivities.
  - The Taoiseach said the country's schools, colleges and childcare facilities were to close until 29 March in response to the COVID-19 pandemic.
  - The GAA, FAI and IRFU took the unprecedented step of suspending all games for a two-week period in response to the coronavirus pandemic.
- 13 March – Senior members of the Gardaí who were due to retire in the coming weeks have been asked to stay on in the national interest.
- 14 March
  - The Taoiseach said COVID-19 was a virus "that knows no borders" at a meeting of the North/South Ministerial Council in Armagh.
  - The Department of Health announced that a second person in the east of the country had died as a result of COVID-19.
  - US Vice-President Mike Pence announced that a travel ban imposed on European nations over the coronavirus pandemic would be extended to Ireland.
- 15 March – The government asked pubs and bars to close until 29 March as part of measures to delay the spread of coronavirus.
- 16 March
  - It was revealed that a possible 140,000 people have been laid off work because of the measures taken to tackle the coronavirus.
  - The GAA offered the use of Croke Park as a COVID-19 drive-through testing centre.
  - Taoiseach Leo Varadkar confirmed that some 15,000 coronavirus infections were expected by the end of the month.
- 17 March
  - For the first time since 2001, there were no traditional St. Patrick's Day parades held in any part of the country.
  - New measures regarding the legal, medical and social welfare elements of the coronavirus were signed off on following an incorporeal meeting of the cabinet.
  - In a special Ministerial Briefing broadcast, Taoiseach Leo Varadkar said the coronavirus emergency could go on for months into the summer.
- 18 March
  - The first of three days of detailed policy discussions between Fianna Fáil and Fine Gael began.
  - Health Minister Simon Harris confirmed that 24,000 people contacted the HSE in response to the request for staff to be on call to assist the health services.
  - The GAA confirmed that the start of the 2020 All-Ireland Football Championship had been delayed due to the coronavirus pandemic.
  - The five main banks agreed to introduce measures to help those affected by coronavirus, including a payment break and the deferment of court proceedings.
  - The Department of Health confirmed that Leitrim, Laois and Monaghan were the only three counties within the state without a COVID-19 case.
- 19 March
  - The 2020 Leaving Cert and Junior Cert oral and practical examinations were cancelled due to the COVID-19 outbreak.
  - The Dáil passed emergency legislation in response to the COVID-19 pandemic without a vote and with a limited number of just 48 TDs present.
  - A woman from the east of the country became the third person in Ireland to die from COVID-19.
- 20 March
  - 319 students, some of whom had only been in training in the Garda College for the last few weeks, were sworn in as Gardaí and assigned to stations all over the country.
  - The Seanad passed emergency legislation giving the State new powers to detain people, restrict travel and keep people in their homes during the COVID-19 crisis.
  - Seán Cox returned home to Dunboyne almost two years after suffering life-changing head injuries in an attack outside a Liverpool match.
- 21 March – Aer Lingus increased its capacity on Spanish routes by 20% in an effort to bring as many Irish citizens home as possible before tonight's deadline of midnight.
- 22 March – A fourth person died of COVID-19 in the Republic of Ireland as confirmed cases passed the 1,000 mark on the island of Ireland.
- 23 March – A number of multi-national fast food chains and restaurants closed their doors due to the coronavirus pandemic, leaving thousands without work.
- 24 March
  - The school and college shutdown was extended until Monday 20 April at the earliest.
  - The Taoiseach announced "unprecedented" restrictions regarding the closures of non-essential retail businesses and facilities effective from midnight.
  - The Government announced a €3.7bn package to support businesses and workers who had been laid-off due to the virus.
- 25 March – Gardaí began three criminal investigations into incidents where emergency service employees had been coughed at or spat at in the course of their work.
- 26 March
  - Minister for Health Simon Harris announced that student nurses would be paid for the duration of the COVID-19 crisis.
  - Front line healthcare workers were applauded by TDs in the Dáil and people all over Ireland at 8pm.
  - The Dáil passed the Emergency Measures in the Public Interest Bill without a vote.
- 27 March
  - The Taoiseach announced that from midnight until 12 April, everybody must stay at home except in specific circumstances.
  - Miriam O'Callaghan became the first female presenter of RTÉ's The Late Late Show when she stood in for regular presenter Ryan Tubridy.
- 28 March – Aer Lingus flight EI9018 left Dublin Airport on the first of up to 60 flights to Beijing to collect medical supplies.
- 29 March – Public funerals were banned in two Catholic dioceses as part of efforts to halt the spread of coronavirus.
- 30 March – Polls closed at 11am and counting began in the election of candidates to the 26th Seanad.
- 31 March
  - Seán Kyne became the first candidate elected to the Seanad.
  - The Government announced that the fuel allowance season would be extended for four weeks as those over 70 were encouraged to continue "cocooning".
  - Construction firm BAM announced that work was to cease on the National Children's Hospital as a result of COVID-19 measures.
- Public access to the swimming pool in the Templemore Garda College is ended in line with public health restrictions

=== April ===
- 1 April
  - Deputy Chief Medical Officer Ronan Glynn took over from Tony Holohan who underwent tests in hospital that were unrelated to COVID-19.
  - It was announced that Special Needs Assistants in schools were to be reassigned to other duties in essential public services as part of the response to COVID-19.
  - The remainder of the 2019-20 Irish National Hunt horse racing season was cancelled, including the Fairyhouse and Punchestown Festivals.
- 2 April
  - President Higgins made a special radio broadcast in which he thanked, on behalf of the presidency and the Irish people, all the efforts of those tackling COVID-19.
  - Health Minister Simon Harris said that the sitting of the Dáil ran contrary to the public health advice which was for people to "stay at home."
  - The number of benefit claimants on the Live Register by March increased to an all-time high of 513,350 - more than a fifth of the working population in the state.
  - Taoiseach Leo Varadkar said that "by hook or by crook" the Leaving and Junior Certificate exams would take place.
- 3 April
  - Part of the recently procured consignment of Personal Protective Equipment (PPE) was described as "not fit for purpose" and "unusable" by medical staff.
  - Alan Kelly became the 13th leader of the Labour Party after beating Aodhán Ó Riordáin in the leadership contest.
- 4 April – Three men were arrested by the PSNI after two ATMs were stolen from banks on the main street in Dundalk overnight.
- 5 April – Taoiseach Leo Varadkar re-registered as a medical practitioner and said he would work one shift a week to help out during the coronavirus crisis.
- 6 April – It was agreed that a full sitting of the Dáil to elect a Taoiseach would take place in the Convention Centre in Dublin if necessary.
- 7 April – Health Minister Simon Harris signed regulations giving Gardaí the power to enforce COVID-19 restrictions.
- 8 April
  - The Gardaí began a special operation which saw additional checkpoints on the roads and extra patrols at key locations, such as parks and beauty spots.
  - The Mater Hospital announced that the intensive care unit there was full with some patients being moved to the high dependency unit.
- 9 April – Health Minister Simon Harris said he expected the restrictions to slow the spread of the coronavirus to be in place for "a period of weeks."
- 10 April
  - Taoiseach Leo Varadkar announced that restrictions on movement implemented to contain the outbreak of COVID-19 would remain in place until 5 May.
  - The Leaving Certificate examinations were postponed until late July or August while the Junior Certificate exams were cancelled.
- 11 April – People all over the country took part in the #ShineYourLight campaign in a gesture of hope and solidarity during the COVID-19 pandemic.
- 12 April – Scaled back ceremonies took place at Áras an Uachtaráin and the GPO to mark the anniversary of the 1916 Easter Rising.
- 13 April
  - The number of people who tested positive for COVID-19 in the Republic passed through the 10,000 threshold nearly a month and a half after the first case.
  - The HSE said that some patients were wrongly told they had tested negative for COVID-19 because some lab tests came back with indeterminate results.
- 14 April – Sinn Féin leader Mary Lou McDonald confirmed that she received a positive diagnosis for COVID-19.
- 15 April
  - A 24-year-old man in Wexford became the first person to be charged with breaching the new restrictions on movement introduced to stop the spread of COVID-19.
  - A joint policy document from Fianna Fáil and Fine Gael was published which included details on economic recovery, health, childcare, housing and a United Ireland.
  - Agreement was reached between unions and the HSE to allow healthcare staff be redeployed into private nursing homes during the COVID-19 crisis.
- 16 April
  - Speaking in the Dáil, the Taoiseach said he was doubtful that restrictions on movement would be lifted on 5 May.
  - The National Public Health Emergency Team (NPHET) reported that Ireland had reached a "plateau" in terms of the spread of the COVID-19 infection.
- 17 April
  - A remote Special Congress of the GAA unanimously approved rule changes to allow the Association to effectively respond to emergencies such as the COVID-19 outbreak.
  - There was growing condemnation of Dublin-based fruit company Keelings after chartering a plane to fly in strawberry pickers from Bulgaria amid the COVID-19 crisis.
  - A new law was passed allowing babies to be registered online for the first time since records began in the mid-19th Century.
- 18 April – The Cranberries became the first Irish band to reach one billion plays on YouTube for their protest song Zombie.
- 19 April – The head of the HSE said that more than one million items of personal protective equipment (PPE) were delivered to nursing homes across Ireland in recent days.
- 20 April
  - The Supreme Court sat using remote video technology for the first time.
  - Virtual sittings of the Dáil and Seanad were ruled out after legal advice stated that such parliamentary meetings were not permitted by the Constitution.
  - The Department of Employment Affairs and Social Protection revealed that over one million people were either fully or partially dependent on the state for income support.
- 21 April
  - Gatherings of more than 5,000 people were banned until the end of August under new government plans.
  - The Minister for Finance said that Irish GDP would fall by 10.5% over the rest of the year with unemployment peaking at 22% in the second quarter.
- 22 April
  - The Taoiseach confirmed that paid leave would be provided for the partners of healthcare workers to assist with childcare issues in the home.
  - Education Minister Joe McHugh asked second-level schools not to act unilaterally after some schools opted out of the replacement Junior Certificate exams.
- 23 April – Health Minister Simon Harris told the Dáil that the reproductive rate for the COVID-19 virus in Ireland had fallen to between 0.5 and 1.
- 24 April – The number of people to die from COVID-19 in the Republic passed the 1,000 mark.
- 25 April – Health Minister Simon Harris suggested that there would be no "big bang" of lifting the COVID-19 restrictions.
- 26 April – A new model that could deliver over 100,000 coronavirus tests per week was formally agreed between the HSE and the Department of Health.
- 27 April – The Rose of Tralee International Festival was cancelled for the first time in its 61-year history because of the coronavirus crisis.
- 28 April – It was revealed that the number of people arrested for suspected breaches of the COVID-19 regulations more than doubled in the previous week.
- 29 April
  - The Horse Racing Ireland chief executive admitted that it would have been better if the Cheltenham Festival had gone ahead behind closed doors.
  - The Taoiseach said that the rate of deaths and new cases of COVID-19 were not low enough to loosen coronavirus restrictions.
  - The Education Minister announced that schools could decide the format and timing of their own forms of assessment for Junior Cert students.
- 30 April – Taoiseach Leo Varadkar said a plan was being developed to relax the current COVID-19 measures but any easing of the restrictions would be done gradually.

=== May ===
- 1 May
  - The Taoiseach announced that the strict COVID-19 restrictions would be extended until 18 May.
  - Ryanair and Aer Lingus revealed that they plan to cut 4,000 jobs as a result of the pandemic.
- 2 May
  - The Government signed off on a €6.5bn package of new supports to help businesses reopen as COVID-19 restrictions are slowly lifted.
  - Fianna Fáil called on the Government to cancel the Leaving Certificate and work on what it called "fair alternatives".
- 3 May
  - The Green Party parliamentary party voted to enter negotiations on a programme for government with Fine Gael and Fianna Fáil.
  - The Health Service Executive began investigating an incident at Regional Hospital Mullingar where the body of a deceased patient was given to the wrong family.
- 4 May – Publicans proposed a plan to convince public health officials to allow bars to reopen six weeks earlier than planned.
- 5 May
  - Some minor easing of COVID-19 restrictions came into effect, including allowing people travel up to 5 km from their home to exercise.
  - Six wild boarlets born in County Donegal were believed to be the first of the species to be born in Ireland in about 800 years.
- 6 May – GAA officials ruled out any inter-county games before October and said there was a lack of appetite for matches with no spectators.
- 7 May
  - Taoiseach Leo Varadkar said it was possible that the coronavirus was already in Ireland much earlier than the first confirmed case in February.
  - The first round of talks between Fine Gael, Fianna Fáil and the Green Party to agree a programme for government took place.
- 8 May
  - The CSO revealed that the unemployment rate for April, as measured by the COVID-19 adjusted measure, jumped to a new record high of 28.2%.
  - The 2020 Leaving Cert exams were cancelled, with all students being offered the option of accepting calculated grades instead of sitting written examinations.
- 9 May – Business Minister Heather Humphreys said that businesses that do not comply with new COVID-19 safety protocols would be shut down.
- 10 May – GAA president John Horan said he did not expect Gaelic games to resume while social distancing measures remained in place.
- 11 May – Chief Medical Officer Tony Holohan said there was cause for concern that some people believed the worst of the coronavirus was over.
- 12 May – The new 19-member Dáil committee on COVID-19 held three and a half hours of private discussions after electing Independent TD, Michael McNamara, as its chair.
- 13 May
  - The Taoiseach said that reopening schools and childcare facilities over the next couple of months was "among the safest things" to do.
  - The Minister for Children and Youth Affairs, Katherine Zappone, said the scheme to provide temporary childcare to healthcare workers had been cancelled due to low take-up.
- 14 May – It was revealed that the Mater Hospital failed to notify health authorities of almost 300 cases of coronavirus within legal time frames.
- 15 May
  - Taoiseach Leo Varadkar announced that Phase One of lifting COVID-19 restrictions would begin on 18 May.
  - The Labour Party formally ruled out joining talks to form a government with Fianna Fáil, Fine Gael and the Green Party.
- 16 May – The number of new cases of COVID-19 reported by the Department of Health fell below 100 for the first time in two months.
- 17 May – The National Famine Commemoration took place in St Stephen's Green in Dublin city centre.
- 18 May – Thousands of shops, businesses and construction sites reopened as part of the first phase of the easing of COVID-19 restrictions.
- 19 May
  - The 2020 Dublin Marathon was cancelled due to the coronavirus pandemic.
  - The CEO of the Health Service Executive, Paul Reid told a Dáil committee that Ireland would be dealing with COVID-19 for some considerable time to come.
- 20 May
  - It emerged that four Green Party councillors had urged Catherine Martin to challenge Eamon Ryan for the leadership of the party.
  - Tánaiste Simon Coveney welcomed the publication of the British government's plan to implement the Northern Ireland Protocol agreed in the Brexit Agreement.
- 21 May
  - An investigation began after the door of an Air Corps helicopter fell off mid-flight and landed in the grounds of Moyle Park College.
  - The ASTI advised teachers not to engage with the new calculated grades system as plans to indemnify teachers against legal action were not strong enough.
- 22 May – Agreement was reached with the ASTI over legal protections for teachers, thus allowing engagement with the predictive grades process for the Leaving Certificate.
- 23 May – Taoiseach Leo Varadkar reaffirmed that the two-metre social distancing rule was to remain in place and that there had been "no change" to the public health advice.
- 24 May – Minister for Health Simon Harris signed the regulations making it mandatory for all passengers coming into Ireland to fill out a passenger locator form.
- 25 May – Chief Medical Officer Tony Holohan reported that there were no deaths of people with COVID-19 in the past 24 hours.
- 26 May
  - More than 17,000 Leaving Certificate students registered their details in the first day of an online registration system for this year's calculated grades.
  - The Oireachtas COVID-19 committee heard that Nursing Homes Ireland repeatedly requested the Health Department to come to their aid in the battle with coronavirus.
- 27 May – Chief Medical Officer Tony Holohan reaffirmed that the public advice on social distancing remained at two metres "for the moment" but was under constant review.
- 28 May – Education Minister Joe McHugh said it was hard to see all students being back at school in September if the two-metre social distancing rule remained in place.
- 29 May
  - The Taoiseach confirmed that all primary and secondary schools would reopen at the beginning of the academic year at the end of August.
  - Ibec asked the Government to bring forward the phases of reopening of the economy, scrap quarantine restrictions and reduce the two-metre social distancing rule.
- 30 May – The statue of Luke Kelly located near Sheriff Street in Dublin was vandalised for the fifth time in 12 months.
- 31 May – Around 100 people demonstrated outside the US embassy in Dublin, demanding justice for George Floyd.

=== June ===
- 1 June – Ireland passed the 25,000 mark for confirmed coronavirus cases after the Department of Health announced an additional 77 confirmed cases.
- 2 June
  - The body of a missing five-year-old boy was recovered from Lough Mask in County Mayo.
  - Dublin Zoo reopened with visitor restrictions in place under new health and safety protocols.
- 3 June – Foreign Minister Simon Coveney said that over 1,000 Irish citizens are stranded overseas as a result of COVID-19 restrictions and want to return home.
- 4 June
  - Taoiseach Leo Varadkar condemned an "absence of moral leadership" in the United States following the murder of George Floyd.
  - The Dáil was told the weekly pandemic unemployment payment would be cut for some part-time workers but would be extended "for months, not weeks" beyond 8 June.
- 5 June – The Taoiseach announced that plans to ease coronavirus lockdown restrictions were being accelerated with the enactment of 'Phase 2 Plus' on 8 June.
- 6 June – The Green Party deputy leader, Catherine Martin, declared her intention to challenge Eamon Ryan for the leadership of the party.
- 7 June – Talks between the leaders of Fine Gael, Fianna Fáil and the Green Party took place as the parties tried to agree a programme for government.
- 8 June
  - Thousands of businesses opened for the first time in three months, as the second phase of the Government's plan to get the economy moving again got under way.
  - A 68-bed field hospital was established at the University of Limerick's Sports Arena to help increase bed capacity at the region's overcrowded acute hospital.
- 9 June – People Before Profit called on local authorities in Galway to remove a monument to Christopher Columbus, which the party claimed glorified slavery and racism.
- 10 June – The world's largest aircraft - the Antonov An-225 - landed at Shannon Airport with a consignment of Personal Protective Equipment for medical staff.
- 11 June
  - Green Party leader Eamon Ryan apologised for using what he called "a racial slur" during a Dáil debate on racism in Irish society.
  - The Government expressed "outrage" over the involvement of crime boss Daniel Kinahan in the brokering of the Tyson Fury-Anthony Joshua boxing match.
- 12 June
  - Mary Irvine became the first woman to be nominated by the Government as President of the High Court.
  - The Taoiseach announced that it aimed to get all children back to school full-time in late August or September by working on "bespoke solutions".
- 13 June – The ASTI said teachers would not accept schools reopening with different social distancing rules than in other workplaces.
- 14 June – Negotiations on a programme for government between the leaders of Fine Gael, Fianna Fáil and the Green Party ended without resolution.
- 15 June
  - Retail outlets in shopping centres reopened for the first time since they were forced to close due to COVID-19 restrictions.
  - A draft programme for government was agreed between Fianna Fáil, Fine Gael and the Green Party including provision for a rotating taoiseach.
  - There were no coronavirus related fatalities on the island of Ireland for the first time in over three months.
- 16 June
  - On Bloomsday, the state broadcaster, RTÉ, repeated its epic 30-hour broadcast of the full text of James Joyce's novel Ulysses for the first time in 38 years. The decision to repeat the broadcast was partly influenced by the COVID-19 quarantine in the country.
  - Former Fianna Fáil deputy leader Éamon Ó Cuív confirmed he would oppose the government formation deal and questioned why an agreement took so long.
- 17 June – Ireland won a seat for a two-year term on the United Nations Security Council.
- 18 June – A murder investigation began following the death of Detective Garda Colm Horkan in an overnight shooting incident in Castlerea, County Roscommon.
- 19 June
  - Aer Lingus confirmed the loss of 500 jobs due to the collapse in aviation traffic during the COVID-19 crisis.
  - The Taoiseach said that the reopening of a number of sectors had moved into Phase 3 of the easing of COVID-19 restrictions.
  - Stephen Silver was formally charged in relation to the fatal shooting of Detective Garda Colm Horkan.
- 20 June – Infectious diseases specialist Sam McConkey said the chances of contracting COVID-19 had reached "one in a million" level in the community.
- 21 June
  - The state funeral of Detective Garda Colm Horkan took place in Charlestown, County Mayo.
  - Clare Bailey, the leader of the Green Party in Northern Ireland, became the latest high-profile member to state her opposition to the draft programme for government.
- 22 June – Hollywood actor Mark Ruffalo took part in a web livestream to discuss fracking and the programme for government with Green Party members.
- 23 June
  - Organisers confirmed that the annual summer pilgrimage to Lough Derg was suspended for the first time in 192 years due to COVID-19.
  - INMO general secretary Phil Ní Sheaghdha told a Dáil committee that Ireland had the highest number of healthcare workers infected with COVID-19 in the world.
- 24 June – Ibec called for Ireland's international travel restrictions to be ended and for testing and tracing to be used in place of "ineffective" quarantine measures.
- 25 June
  - The government held what was expected to be its final cabinet meeting at Dublin Castle.
  - It was announced that the wearing of face coverings on public transport would be made mandatory with a sanction for non-compliance.
- 26 June – Members of the Green Party, Fianna Fáil and Fine Gael voted in favour of backing the programme for government.
- 27 June
  - A socially-distanced full sitting of Dáil Éireann took place at the Convention Centre in Dublin.
  - Micheál Martin succeeded Leo Varadkar as Taoiseach in a three-party coalition government.
  - Eileen Ní Fhloinn became the first Traveller in the Oireachtas when the new taoiseach appointed her as a senator in the Seanad.
- 28 June – Newly elected Taoiseach Micheál Martin was greeted by dozens of supporters and neighbours on his arrival home to Ballinlough in Cork city.
- 29 June
  - Pubs serving food, cafés and restaurants, hotels, hairdressers and beauty salons, tourist attractions and remaining retail outlets resumed trading as restrictions eased.
  - The new Cabinet held its first detailed discussions at Dublin Castle.
- 30 June – The Irish Travel Agents Association called on the Government to give clarity and make a decision on whether people should travel abroad or not.

=== July ===
- 1 July – The Government confirmed the full list of ministers of state, with seven from Fianna Fáil, seven from Fine Gael and three Green Party TDs.
- 2 July
  - The Revenue Commissioners revealed that around 410,000 people are still having their incomes supported under the Temporary Wage Subsidy Scheme.
  - Chief Medical Officer Tony Holohan announced that he was "taking time out" from his work commitments as his wife had been admitted to palliative care with cancer.
- 3 July – Gardaí began conducting checks of licensed premises nationwide to check if they were adhering to the public health guidelines for COVID-19.
- 4 July – Gardaí closed a premises "allegedly operating as a restaurant" in Dublin and seized a large amount of alcohol after observing breaches of the COVID-19 regulations.
- 5 July – Two brothers died while scuba diving in a quarry in Portroe, County Tipperary.
- 6 July
  - The Taoiseach announced that non-essential international travel was not advised until at least 20 July.
  - The Irish Road Victims Association called for the Agriculture Minister Barry Cowen to resign after it emerged he received a driving ban for drink-driving in 2016.
  - Dublin City Council voted unanimously to award the Freedom of the City of Dublin to Chief Medical Officer Tony Holohan.
- 7 July
  - A new COVID-19 tracker app was downloaded by more than 700,000 people just hours after it went live.
  - In a personal Dáil statement on his 2016 drink-driving ban, Agriculture Minister Barry Cowen said he made a "stupid, stupid mistake" and was profoundly sorry.
- 8 July
  - The Microenterprise Loan Fund Bill became the first piece of legislation to be passed outside of Leinster House since the foundation of the State.
  - The Department of Health confirmed that one million people had downloaded the COVID-19 tracker app in its first two days.
- 9 July
  - NPHET said there was an "immediate need to take care and caution" as the reproductive rate of COVID-19 in Ireland stood at, or above, 1.
  - Minister for Finance Paschal Donohoe was elected as president of the group of eurozone finance ministers.
- 10 July – The Taoiseach said that regulations to enforce the compulsory wearing of face coverings on public transport would come into effect from 13 July.
- 11 July – Two people were injured in a light aircraft crash near Killimordaly in County Galway.
- 12 July – Agriculture Minister Barry Cowen issued a statement stating he did not attempt to evade a Garda on the night he was found to be drink-driving in September 2016.
- 13 July – Public transport companies reported a high compliance rate for the new face covering regulations that came into effect.
- 14 July
  - Birders flocked to Greystones after what was believed to be the first ever sighting of a tropical Brown Booby in Ireland.
  - The National Public Health Emergency Team expressed concern to the Government about the scheduled reopening of all bars on 20 July.
  - Agriculture Minister Barry Cowen was sacked by Taoiseach Micheál Martin following ongoing controversy over his 2016 drink-driving ban.
- 15 July
  - The General Court of the European Union annulled the decision taken by the European Commission regarding Ireland's €13.1bn tax rulings in favour of Apple.
  - Taoiseach Micheál Martin nominated Fianna Fáil deputy leader Dara Calleary to replace Barry Cowen as Agriculture Minister.
  - The Government announced that face coverings had to be worn in all shops, retail settings and shopping centres.
  - The Cabinet decided that Ireland would not progress to Phase 4 of lifting the COVID-19 restrictions on 20 July over concerns about an increase in new COVID-19 cases.
- 16 July – The Acting Chief Medical Officer warned that Ireland was in a precarious and uncertain position in relation to the coronavirus pandemic.
- 17 July – Taoiseach Micheál Martin travelled to Brussels for the first physical meeting of all European leaders since the coronavirus pandemic began.
- 18 July – The Taoiseach said Ireland would be a net contributor to the European Union's €750 billion COVID-19 recovery fund.
- 19 July – The government delayed the publication of its overseas travel "green list" as the Cabinet meeting to sign off on the measure was postponed.
- 20 July – A building site in Dublin city centre was closed down temporarily after more than 20 workers tested positive for COVID-19.
- 21 July
  - A Health Information and Quality Authority report revealed that half of nursing homes inspected were not following proper infection prevention and control measures.
  - The Government agreed on a list of 15 countries where people can travel without being asked to quarantines on their return.
- 22 July – Voting in the Green Party leadership contest closed at 5.30pm.
- 23 July
  - Independent TD for Galway West Catherine Connolly became the first woman to be elected to the position of Leas-Cheann Comhairle of Dáil Éireann.
  - The Government announced a €7bn July Jobs Stimulus package of 50 new measures to boost economic recovery and get people back to work.
  - The Green Party re-elected Eamon Ryan as its leader by a margin of 48 votes.
- 24 July – The Taoiseach confirmed that all schools would fully reopen at the end of August.
- 25 July – A rare copy of the 1916 Proclamation sold for €190,000 at an auction in Dublin.
- 26 July – The Department of Social Protection confirmed that 104 cases of Pandemic Unemployment Payment were stopped after checks carried out at airports.
- 27 July
  - Gardaí began a murder investigation following the fatal shooting of a man in Ballyfermot in Dublin.
  - The Taoiseach, Cabinet ministers and junior ministers took a 10% pay cut, backdated to when they took up office.
  - The Government agreed a €370m fund to ensure the safe and timely reopening of 4,000 schools for some one million pupils.
  - Journalist Alison O'Reilly makes public the names of 1,024 illegitimate children who died in Sean Ross Abbey mother and baby home (c.1932–70), in the Irish Daily Star.
- 28 July – New legislation was passed stating that anyone in receipt of the Pandemic Unemployment Payment had to be "genuinely seeking" employment.
- 29 July
  - A review by the Social Protection Minister stated that those on the Pandemic Unemployment Payment would be entitled to travel abroad but only to green list countries.
  - Four 153-year-old statues were removed from the front of the Shelbourne Hotel in the mistaken belief that they depicted slaves.
- 30 July
  - A healthcare assistant who raped a 73-year-old woman with Alzheimer's disease in her nursing home bed during the COVID-19 lockdown was jailed for 11 years.
  - Green Party TD Neasa Hourigan resigned as party whip after voting against the Government twice on amendments to the Residential Tenancies Bill.
- 31 July
  - Around 200 Muslims and dignitaries gathered for the celebration of Eid al-Adha in Croke Park.
  - The Taoiseach and Northern Ireland First Minister described the first meeting of the North/South Ministerial Council in three-and-a-half years as "constructive" and "warm".

=== August ===
- 1 August – Swimming was banned in five County Clare beaches after the waters tested for high levels of bacteria following heavy rain in the area.
- 2 August – Health Minister Stephen Donnelly announced that the Government is to introduce COVID-19 testing at airports due to the rise in cases in other countries.
- 3 August – The new president of the Association of Secondary Teachers Ireland warned of a teacher shortage ahead of schools reopening.
- 4 August – The Taoiseach confirmed that the reopening of pubs, hotel bars and nightclubs would not go ahead on 10 August as planned.
- 5 August – Figures revealed that the budget deficit increased to €7.4 billion in July as VAT receipts crashed and spending on income supports related to the pandemic soared.
- 6 August
  - HIQA published evidence showing that mass temperature screening at airports would be ineffective in limiting the spread of COVID-19.
  - Dublin City Council began an investigation into the unauthorised removal of four statues from outside the Shelbourne Hotel.
- 7 August – The Taoiseach announced the implementation of limited restrictions in counties Kildare, Laois and Offaly for two weeks in response to the spread of COVID-19.
- 8 August – The Garda Síochána began conducting checkpoints near the borders of counties Kildare, Laois and Offaly as part of the measures imposed on the counties.
- 9 August – Three of the four meat plants in the midlands where significant clusters of COVID-19 were found among the workforces decided to defer reopening.
- 10 August
  - The wearing of face coverings became mandatory in shops, shopping centres and other indoor settings.
  - Tullamore food company Carroll Cuisine temporarily suspended production after it came under intense pressure to close following an outbreak of COVID-19.
- 11 August – The Taoiseach announced that serial testing would be rolled out at meat plants across the country.
- 12 August – Aaron Brady was found guilty of the capital murder of Detective Garda Adrian Donohoe outside Lordship Credit Union in County Louth in 2013.
- 13 August
  - Micheál Martin held his first face-to-face meeting with British Prime Minister Boris Johnson since becoming Taoiseach during a visit to Northern Ireland.
  - Two paddleboarders were recovering in hospital after being rescued by a local fisherman, southwest of Inis Oírr, having spent 15 hours stranded in the water.
- 14 August
  - Sub-Lieutenant Tahlia Britton became the Irish Navy's first female diver when she received her diving log book in a ceremony at Haulbowline.
  - Two of the four meat plants in the midlands hit by COVID-19 outbreaks—Irish Dog Foods in Naas and Carroll Cuisine in Tullamore—reopened on a phased basis.
- 15 August – The chairman of Fáilte Ireland, Michael Cawley, stepped down after it emerged he had travelled to Italy on holiday.
- 16 August
  - The Licensed Vintners Association called for a Dublin pub to be shut down after videos emerged of customers and staff not adhering to COVID-19 guidelines.
  - Gardaí began an investigation after a woman lodged a complaint that she had been racially abused and pushed into Dublin's Royal Canal by a group of teenage boys.
- 17 August
  - CSO figures revealed that the volume of cars was returning to pre-pandemic levels, while the amount of lorries on roads was exceeding the same period for 2019.
  - Simon Coveney stated that Ireland did not accept the result of the Belarusian presidential election and that he was "deeply concerned" about human rights abuses there.
  - 28,000 recipients failed to confirm their eligibility for the COVID-19 Pandemic Unemployment Payment.
- 18 August
  - CSO surveys revealed that almost two-thirds of businesses are concerned about another lockdown.
  - New measures to suppress the coronavirus were announced, including limiting the numbers at all public gatherings, with sports events to be held behind closed doors.
  - Met Éireann issued a Status Orange wind warning for seven counties and warned of flooding ahead of the arrival of Storm Ellen.
- 19 August – Met Éireann issued a Status Red wind warning for County Cork as Storm Ellen approached Ireland.
- 20 August
  - Over 194,000 homes and businesses were left without power as Storm Ellen battered the country overnight, which led to fallen trees and flooding.
  - The Department of Education confirmed that buses for second-level students would run at 50% capacity, like all other public transport.
  - Minister for Agriculture Dara Calleary apologised for attending a golf society event with more than 80 people, which breached public health guidelines.
  - It was revealed that Ireland's total population was estimated at 4.98 million, up nearly 5 percent when compared with the April 2016 census figure.
- 21 August
  - Minister for Agriculture Dara Calleary and Seanad Leas-Chathaoirleach Jerry Buttimer resigned after they attended an event which contravened public health advice.
  - The Government announced that COVID-19 restrictions in Kildare would be extended for another two weeks and that restrictions in Laois and Offaly would be lifted.
  - The Department of Education introduced changes to the format of the Junior and Leaving Certificate exams and course work for 2021.
- 22 August
  - Opposition parties demanded for the Dáil to be recalled early to address both the political fallout from the golf event and the Government strategy to tackle COVID-19.
  - A 23-year-old female inmate became the first prisoner in the Irish prison system to be diagnosed with coronavirus.
  - Around 500 people attended an anti-lockdown rally organised by the Yellow Vests Ireland group at Custom House Quay in Dublin.
  - Health Minister Stephen Donnelly confirmed that the passenger locator form would move to an online process on Wednesday 26 August.
  - Taoiseach Micheál Martin and Tánaiste Leo Varadkar asked EU Commissioner Phil Hogan to 'consider his position', following his attendance at a controversial golf dinner.
- 23 August
  - The Government agreed to recall the Dáil early following opposition demands to return to deal with the response to the coronavirus crisis and to the golf event.
  - A spokesperson confirmed that Phil Hogan would not be resigning as EU Commissioner after his attendance at a controversial golf society dinner.
  - Philip Nolan of the NPHET Epidemiological Modelling Advisory Group said that 100 children aged between 5 and 14 tested positive for COVID-19 in the last two weeks.
  - It was reported that Ireland's EU Commissioner Phil Hogan was stopped by gardaí for using his mobile phone while driving in Kildare on 17 August.
  - Gardaí began an investigation after a woman in her 80s was killed in an assault in Clontarf, Dublin. A man in his 60s was arrested at the scene.
- 24 August
  - Dara Calleary resigned as Deputy leader of Fianna Fáil and as national secretary of the party.
  - Met Éireann issued a Status Orange rainfall warning and two Status Yellow warnings for wind and rain as Storm Francis approached.
  - It was announced that former Chief Justice Susan Denham would carry out a review into the attendance of Supreme Court Justice Séamus Woulfe at a golfing event.
- 25 August
  - Children and teenagers began returning to school as the phased reopening of schools in Ireland began after six months of closure due to COVID-19.
  - Emergency services evacuated the Department of Health after a suspicious package was discovered.
  - EU Commissioner Phil Hogan told RTÉ News that he broke no regulations while in Ireland, was no risk to anybody but made big mistakes and was very embarrassed.
  - Education Minister Norma Foley stated that students who refuse to wear a face covering, other than for medical reasons, would be sent home from secondary schools.
- 26 August
  - Education Minister Norma Foley announced that the postponed Leaving Certificate exams would commence on Monday 16 November.
  - Phil Hogan resigned as EU Trade Commissioner in light of the Oireachtas Golf Society scandal.
- 27 August
  - The Taoiseach discussed the appointment of a new EU Commissioner with European Commission President Ursula von der Leyen.
  - The National Public Health Emergency Team is to recommend that the government don't reopen pubs on 31 August.
- 28 August
  - The Government agreed legislation that would give gardaí the power to shut pubs that are not adhering to public health guidelines.
  - Aptar manufacturing factory in Ballinasloe confirmed that it would cease operations by December 2020 with the loss of 115 jobs.
  - Finance Minister Paschal Donohoe encouraged employers to register for the new Employment Wage Subsidy Scheme from 1 September 2020.
- 31 August – Specific COVID-19 restrictions in County Kildare were lifted "with immediate effect".

=== September ===
- 1 September
  - A Dublin primary school class was sent home after one pupil tested positive for COVID-19.
  - The Government leaders agreed to submit two nominees for the position of European Commissioner following Phil Hogan's resignation.
  - Over 22,100 employers registered for the new Employment Wage Subsidy Scheme which commenced, replacing the Temporary COVID-19 Wage Subsidy Scheme.
  - Education Minister Norma Foley announced that 17% of Leaving Certificate grades calculated by schools would be reduced and 4% would be increased.
- 2 September
  - Taoiseach Micheál Martin nominated Charlie McConalogue to replace Dara Calleary as Agriculture Minister.
  - A second Dublin primary school class was sent home after a number of pupils tested positive for COVID-19.
  - A primary school in County Clare closed for one week after a number of staff members were identified as close contacts of a case of COVID-19.
- 3 September
  - The Government launched the Stay and Spend Scheme to help drive sales in the hospitality sector during the off-season which have been impacted as a result of COVID-19.
  - The HSE said around 1,000 people who have been scheduled for COVID-19 tests do not show up.
- 4 September
  - Tánaiste Leo Varadkar stated that the rule requiring restaurants to keep details of customer food orders was designed to "crack down" on COVID-19 regulation breaches.
  - The Government named Mairead McGuinness and Andrew McDowell as Ireland's nominees to fill the vacant EU Commissioner role.
- 5 September – Church bells rang out across the country in celebration of National Services Day.
- 6 September – Draft guidelines for the reopening of pubs that do not serve food with strict table service policies were drawn up by the Government and Fáilte Ireland.
- 7 September
  - Over 61,000 students received their Leaving Certificate exam results with grades significantly higher than any other year on record.
  - A school in Cork City confirmed a positive case of COVID-19.
  - New figures revealed that Ireland was officially in recession after the economy shrank by 6.1%, the largest quarterly drop on record, between April and June.
  - The Government launched the €2 billion Credit Guarantee Scheme to provide Irish businesses with access to low cost loans as they respond to the impacts of COVID-19.
- 8 September
  - The Government announced that pubs not serving food in Ireland could reopen on 21 September with strict regulations in place.
  - Mairead McGuinness was nominated as European Commissioner for Financial Stability, Financial Services and the Capital Markets Union.
- 9 September – The Taoiseach told the British Prime Minister that its proposed breach of international law on the Northern Ireland Brexit protocol was utterly unacceptable.
- 10 September – NPHET recommended that new household restrictions be introduced in Dublin to address rising numbers of COVID-19 cases in the capital.
- 11 September
  - CAO points for entry into most college courses increased significantly as 54,000 applicants received offers for third-level places.
  - The Department of Justice and the HSE confirmed that widespread COVID-19 testing would begin in all direct provision centres from 12 September.
- 12 September
  - The Taoiseach said that the government would have "no hesitation" in implementing restrictions for Dublin if cases continue to rise.
  - Around 3,000 attended two anti-mask protests organised by the Yellow Vests Ireland group at Custom House Quay in Dublin.
- 13 September
  - Simon Coveney said trust had been "eroded" due to the British government's intent to override elements of the Brexit Withdrawal Agreement.
  - Gardaí began an investigation of an assault of an activist following anti-mask protests outside Leinster House on 12 September.
  - Gardaí increased high visibility patrols in Dublin to support the public health guidelines in place to reduce the spread of COVID-19.
- 14 September
  - The Book of Kells received a new state-of-the-art display case which will allow for every page of the manuscript to be displayed on a rotating basis.
  - The self-isolation period for patients who test positive for COVID-19 was reduced from 14 days to 10 days.
- 15 September
  - The Government postponed the 2021 population census until April 2022, under advice from the Central Statistics Office, because of health and logistical obstacles caused by the COVID-19 pandemic.
  - The Government launched its medium-term plan to help the country live with COVID-19, saying that the entire country was currently at Level 2 of the five-level framework.
  - The entire Cabinet and the Acting Chief Medical Officer restricted their movements after Health Minister Stephen Donnelly underwent a COVID-19 test which was negative.
- 16 September – The highest number of Leaving Certificate appeals on record were lodged this year by students unhappy with their calculated grades.
- 17 September – Germany and Poland were among seven countries included on the Government's updated travel green list, while Greece and Italy were removed.
- 18 September
  - The Taoiseach announced that Dublin would move to Level 3 restrictions from midnight and will remain in place for three weeks until 9 October.
  - Gardaí began an investigation of an assault after a woman threw a smoothie in the face of the Tánaiste Leo Varadkar.
- 19 September
  - President Michael D. Higgins announced the death of his dog Síoda following a short illness.
  - Garda checkpoints were mounted across Dublin City and County as Operation Fanacht recommenced following the imposition of Level 3 restrictions.
- 20 September – The main trade union for secondary school teachers, the ASTI, confirmed it would ballot for industrial action over concerns about staff safety.
- 21 September
  - Publicans outside Dublin opened their premises for the first time in months, with the lifting of restrictions on bars outside the capital.
  - The Acting Chief Medical Officer raised concerns about the level of COVID-19 in counties Louth, Donegal and Waterford.
  - Gardaí began a criminal investigation after a large crowd not abiding by COVID-19 restrictions gathered on the night of 19 September in Dublin.
- 23 September
  - The Tánaiste, Foreign Affairs Minister and Finance Minister restricted their movements under COVID-19 public health advice.
  - A specialist in infectious diseases warned that Ireland was at the beginning of a second wave of COVID-19.
- 24 September
  - The Health Service Executive (HSE) launched its €600 million Winter Plan to help tackle the challenges posed by COVID-19.
  - The Taoiseach announced that County Donegal would move to Level 3 restrictions from the midnight of 25 September and will remain in place for three weeks until 16 October.
- 25 September
  - Garda checkpoints were mounted across County Donegal from midnight as Operation Fanacht recommenced following the imposition of Level 3 restrictions.
  - Higher Education Minister Simon Harris announced that all higher education institutions were asked to deliver lectures remotely where possible for the next two weeks.
  - The Taoiseach announced that localised restrictions may be implemented to stem the rise of COVID-19 cases in Cork, Waterford, Limerick and Galway.
  - An outbreak of COVID-19 on a ward at the Regional Hospital Mullingar was confirmed after a number of patients tested positive for COVID-19.
- 26 September
  - Donegal officially entered Level 3 restrictions which came into effect to curb the rising spread of COVID-19.
  - In a video message, the Acting Chief Medical Officer announced that further restrictions may be implemented in other areas in Ireland, but it was not inevitable.
- 27 September – Republican prisoners in Portlaoise Prison started a two-week hunger strike in support of a Palestinian doctor they claimed was being housed in "appalling conditions" at Maghaberry Prison in Antrim.
- 28 September – SIPO was asked to investigate the legality of former Minister Michael D'Arcy's appointment to an investment fund lobby group.
- 29 September – A multi-agency meeting took place in Galway to discuss public health concerns after hundreds of students congregated in the city on the night of 28 September.
- 30 September – Education Minister Norma Foley apologised after two coding errors were identified in the Leaving Certificate calculated grades system.

=== October ===
- 1 October
  - NPHET recommended to Government that a maximum of six people only from a single household should be allowed visit another home nationwide.
  - A report concluded that Supreme Court judge Séamus Woulfe "did not break any law or...breach any guidelines" in attending the Oireachtas Golf Society event in August.
- 2 October – Minister for Finance Paschal Donohoe announced that the budget deficit would be less than the predicted €30bn due better than forecast income tax returns.
- 3 October – A review into the Leaving Certificate calculated grades system found a third error in the coding used to standardise results.
- 4 October – NPHET recommended to Government the highest level of restrictions for the entire country – Level 5.
- 5 October
  - The GAA and LGFA paused all club fixtures "with immediate effect and until further notice" in light of NPHET's latest recommendations.
  - The Cabinet rejected NPHET's recommendation to place the entire country under Level 5 restrictions, instead moving the entire country to Level 3 restrictions.
  - Tánaiste Leo Varadkar stated that the recommendation from NPHET to move to Level 5 "hadn't been thought through and there hadn't been prior consultation".
- 6 October – It was confirmed that 31 people had tested positive for COVID-19 at Kilminchy Lodge Nursing Home in Portlaoise.
- 7 October
  - Large-scale Garda checkpoints were mounted across the country as Operation Fanacht recommenced following the imposition of Level 3 restrictions.
  - It was confirmed that the Government was considering the introduction of fines to deter people from breaking COVID-19 travel restrictions.
  - The Dáil voted to pass to committee stage the Dying with Dignity Bill proposed by Deputy Gino Kenny. A Government amendment to establish a special committee to examine assisted dying was voted down; the bill will instead be examined by one of the existing Oireachtas committees.
- 8 October
  - The Department of Foreign Affairs confirmed that from 12 October, there will be no countries on the Government's travel Green List.
  - A secondary school in Longford announced its closure due to a confirmed case of COVID-19.
  - The number of cases of COVID-19 in Ireland passed 40,000.
  - The four Archbishops of Ireland called a meeting with the Taoiseach to allow people return to Mass under Level 3 restrictions.
- 9 October
  - The Department of Education announced that no decision has been made in relation to extending school closures over the mid-term break by one week.
  - A survey by the Irish Hotels Federation (IHF) revealed that more than 3.3 million bednight bookings were lost following the Government's escalation to Level 3 restrictions.
  - A business group of 2,500 businesses in Dublin urged consumers to start their Christmas shopping early to prevent large queues in December.
  - The Cabinet COVID-19 sub-committee agreed to introduce fines for non-compliance with COVID-19 rules, with laws being drafted by the Ministers for Health and Justice.
  - University College Cork confirmed several cases of COVID-19 amongst students in a UCC-run student accommodation.
- 10 October – Chief Medical Officer Dr Tony Holohan expressed worry after 1,012 new cases of COVID-19 were notified in a 24-hour period.
- 11 October – Minister for Health Stephen Donnelly said there was no plan to extend the school mid-term break in an effort to curb the rising COVID-19 numbers.
- 12 October – The High Court rejected a third attempt by France to extradite Ian Bailey for the murder of Sophie Toscan du Plantier.
- 13 October
  - The biggest giveaway budget in history saw overall Government spending increase to €106bn, including a €3.4 billion recovery fund in the event of a Level 5 lockdown.
  - The Garda Commissioner Drew Harris was restricting his movements following contact with a Garda officer who subsequently tested positive for COVID-19.
- 14 October
  - Planning permission was granted by Cork City Council for a new €140m development at the old Port of Cork site that will include Ireland's tallest building.
  - The Cabinet agreed a ban on all household visits nationwide, while Donegal, Cavan and Monaghan were also moved to Level 4 restrictions.
- 15 October – Minister for Foreign Affairs Simon Coveney said a Brexit deal between the UK and the EU is "in sight" and could be reached by the start of November.
- 16 October – NPHET recommended to Government to move the entire country to Level 5 restrictions for six weeks.
- 17 October
  - NPHET officials briefed the three leaders of the Government to explain why they recommended moving the entire country to Level 5 COVID-19 restrictions for six weeks.
  - Simon Coveney began restricting his movements after attending a meeting where Austrian Foreign Minister Alexander Schallenberg tested positive for COVID-19.
- 18 October – Minister for Higher Education Simon Harris said the Government will have to bring in more "decisive and nationwide" COVID-19 restrictions.
- 19 October
  - The Government agreed to move the entire country to Level 5 lockdown restrictions from midnight on Wednesday 21 October for six weeks until 1 December.
  - Ireland's COVID Tracker app became one of the first wave of national apps linked with other countries across the European Union after being linked with similar contact tracing apps from Italy and Germany.
  - The Garda Síochána confirmed that a senior officer received a notification of a positive test result of COVID-19 after attending a media briefing.
- 20 October
  - The Government agreed to give Gardaí new powers to fine people €1,000 who hold house parties and up to €500 who breach travel restrictions following the imposition of Level 5 restrictions.
  - Aldi Süd announced that they will be limiting customer purchases of Christmas toys on sale to one unit per customer and will introduce new safety measures for Christmas toy launch.
- 22 October
  - Schools nationwide were told to stop using ViraPro cleaning products and hand sanitisers, as they were being recalled because they contained methanol instead of ethanol.
  - The Government agreed to align Ireland with the new European 'traffic light' system to coordinate international COVID-19 travel restrictions coming into force on Sunday 8 November.
  - Gardaí began a major high visibility policing operation to support the new public health restrictions to curb the spread of COVID-19 with over 2,500 gardaí deployed every day on 132 static and mobile checkpoints nationwide, as Operation Fanacht recommenced following the imposition of Level 5 restrictions.
  - A nursing home in Ahascragh, Ballinasloe, County Galway appealed to the HSE for emergency staff after 42 residents and staff tested positive for COVID-19, and one death confirmed.
- 23 October
  - The Government urged to ensure the essential retailers that are permitted to remain open during the Level 5 lockdown restrict their sales activities to essential items only after Retail Excellence, the largest retail body in Ireland, announced that some of its members made complaints that some large retailers were breaching the current restrictions by selling non-essential items while being allowed to stay open to sell essential items.
  - The Dáil passed legislation empowering the Garda Síochána to impose new fines on people who breach COVID-19 regulations.
  - A nursing home in Moate, County Westmeath confirmed an outbreak of COVID-19 after 11 of 47 residents and four staff tested positive for COVID-19.
  - The HSE confirmed an outbreak of COVID-19 in an older persons' community residential facility in County Mayo after a number of residents and staff tested positive for COVID-19.
- 24 October
  - Two wards including a psychiatric unit at Naas General Hospital was locked down after an outbreak of COVID-19 was confirmed which infected 9 patients and 18 staff.
  - Four Fine Gael senators began self-isolating after two tested positive for COVID-19.
- 25 October
  - The President signed into law the Health (Amendment) Bill 2020 allowing gardaí to issue graduated fines to people found to be in breach of the Level 5 COVID-19 regulations.
  - A report published by Eurosurveillance revealed that passengers on a flight to Dublin during the summer led to the spread of 59 COVID-19 cases around the country.
- 26 October – Gardaí began a murder-suicide investigation after a father and two sons died following a shooting incident at a farm outside Kanturk in County Cork.
- 28 October
  - Gardaí investigating the shooting incident, which occurred on 26 October, looked at the possibility that the fatal shooting of 26-year-old Mark O'Sullivan may have been planned by his younger brother 23-year-old Diarmuid O'Sullivan over a period of time after a detailed 10-page note was discovered on the body of his younger brother.
  - A candlelit vigil was held in honour of the mother and her two children who were found dead in a house in Dublin.
  - Ryanair announced it will only operate flights from Dublin Airport in Ireland from 14 November to 12 December, with all flights from regional airports suspended.
- 29 October
  - Gardaí issued an appeal to motorists to slow down when approaching checkpoints as part of Operation Fanacht.
  - Gardaí investigating the deaths of a 37-year-old mother, 11-year-old daughter and 6-year-old son at their Dublin home appealed for anyone with information to come forward.
  - The Department of Education issued an urgent notice to schools that a further 52 sanitising products have been removed from its approved list following the recall of ViraPro sanitisers on 22 October.
- 30 October
  - Met Éireann issued a Status Orange wind warning for Halloween for 12 counties and warned of severe and damaging gusts of up to 130 km/h ahead of the arrival of Storm Aiden.
  - Gardaí launched a murder investigation into the deaths of a mother and two children who were discovered dead in a house in Ballinteer, Dublin on 28 October.
  - The Irish Prison Service confirmed an outbreak of COVID-19 at the Midlands Prison after five inmates tested positive for COVID-19.
  - The Office of Public Works announced that the perimeter gates of Phoenix Park would be closed on weekends for the remainder of Level 5 COVID-19 restrictions.
  - A new English-Irish dictionary produced by Foras na Gaeilge containing 1,800 pages, over 30,000 entries and 1.8 million words was published by President Michael D. Higgins.
- 31 October
  - Over 8,000 homes and businesses were left without power as Storm Aiden battered the country with severe gusts of up to 130 km/h, which led to fallen trees and flooding.
  - Dublin Fire Brigade received 398 fire-related calls on Halloween, making it the busiest night of 2020.

=== November ===
- 1 November – The VAT reduction for the tourism and hospitality sector dropped from 13.5% to 9%, as part of Budget 2021.
- 2 November – Additional measures were put in place at the Midlands Prison after 6 prison staff tested positive for COVID-19.
- 3 November – The Tánaiste apologised in the Dáil for "errors of judgement" after he gave a copy of a contract negotiated between the Government and the Irish Medical Organisation to the National Association of General Practitioners in April 2019.
- 4 November – An outbreak of COVID-19 was confirmed in a nursing home in County Kerry after 19 residents and staff tested positive for COVID-19.
- 7 November
  - Minister for Transport Eamon Ryan announced that anyone arriving into Ireland from Denmark would have to restrict their movements for 14 days over concerns of a new strain of coronavirus that emerged in Danish mink farms.
  - Locals in Joe Biden's ancestral home in Ballina, County Mayo celebrated as he defeated Donald Trump in the 2020 United States presidential election becoming the President-elect of the United States.
  - President Michael D. Higgins and Taoiseach Micheál Martin congratulated Joe Biden on his win as President-elect of the United States.
- 8 November
  - Eight gardaí were suspended from duty as part of an ongoing investigation into alleged corruption.
  - The Government was criticised for a lack of clarity on what COVID-19 restrictions would apply at Christmas after the chair of the Irish Epidemiological Modelling Advisory Group Philip Nolan warned that strict limits would be needed on Christmas gatherings.
  - Taoiseach Micheál Martin became the third Taoiseach to attend the Remembrance Day service in Enniskillen, County Fermanagh to commemorate the Remembrance Day bombing in 1987.
  - The EU's traffic light system for air travel came into operation in Ireland from midnight, with the European Centre for Disease Prevention and Control publishing a three-stage colour system map every week to indicate the level of risk in each area of the EU.
- 15 November – Furious reactions emerged on social media after hundreds of people, in breach of Level 5 COVID-19 restrictions, gathered drinking takeaway pints on the streets of Dublin city centre on the night of 14 November.
- 16 November – Fewer than 2,600 students participated in the postponed Leaving Certificate exams, which got underway.
- 19 November
  - The Health Service Executive (HSE) confirmed that no positive COVID-19 cases have been identified after testing took place of all workers at mink farms nationwide, following the discovery of a new strain of the coronavirus in minks in Denmark.
  - New figures released by the Garda Síochána shows that 29 retailers have been found in potential breach of Level 5 restrictions in November, as part of Operation Treoraím.
  - The European Centre for Disease Prevention and Control moved Ireland from 'red' to 'orange' on the EU traffic light map for international travel after COVID-19 figures improved.
- 20 November
  - RTÉ's top news presenters apologised after being present at a gathering in Montrose where social distancing was not fully observed and presenters posed for photographs.
  - The Health Service Executive (HSE) confirmed that six residents of a County Kerry nursing home died after testing positive for COVID-19.
  - 22 patients in a South Dublin hospital tested positive for COVID-19 after an outbreak emerged in the hospital.
- 22 November – Nine males were arrested in connection with a series of minor public order incidents in Cork after footage circulated on social media showing large groups of people without masks and not adhering to social distancing regulations in the city centre on the night of 21 November.
- 23 November – The Competition and Consumer Protection Commission (CCPC) announced that children's toys which do not meet safety standards or regulations could be dangerous and should not be purchased after over 50,000 toys were destroyed.
- 24 November
  - Cinemas, galleries, museums, hairdressers, gyms and non-essential retail are expected to reopen from 1 December, under plans being considered on exiting the Level 5 lockdown.
  - Tánaiste Leo Varadkar stated in the Dáil that a third wave of restrictions may be required in the new year after the Christmas holiday.
  - The Health Service Executive (HSE) confirmed that outpatient appointments were cancelled at a hospital in Loughlinstown, Dublin after an outbreak of COVID-19 of 31 patients was confirmed.
  - The Department of Health and the Department of Justice announced that the new fines system, enforced by the Garda Síochána and first agreed on 9 October, would come into effect from December, with a €500 fine for organising an event, €150 for attending an event, €100 for breaching travel regulations and €80 for not wearing a face covering in shops and public transport.
  - Presentation College, Carlow generated controversy when it was revealed female pupils in all years had been told not to wear "tight clothing", including official uniform polo shirts, as it was "distracting" for male teachers. Male schoolmates were not spoken to about their clothing. A resulting petition generated 5,000 signatures within the day.
- 25 November
  - Tánaiste Leo Varadkar told the Fine Gael parliamentary party that the Government is considering advising people not to travel to Northern Ireland from later this week amid the worsening COVID-19 situation there.
  - The Health Service Executive (HSE) started to move residents out of a nursing home, where 8 residents died, in Listowel, County Kerry after an outbreak of COVID-19 was confirmed.
  - All staff and students at a Gaelscoil primary school in Glanmire, County Cork began restricting their movements until 8 December, after 17 cases of COVID-19 was confirmed there, resulting in the closure of the school.
- 26 November
  - NPHET recommended to Government that restaurants and pubs should only be allowed to offer takeaway and delivery service for the entire Christmas period.
  - More than 1.6 million people are to receive the Christmas Bonus from the State this year, with €390 million in total to be paid out.
- 27 November
  - The Government agreed to move the entire country to Level 3 restrictions from midnight on Tuesday 1 December.
  - The 2020 edition of The Late Late Toy Show aired, marking the 12th hosted by Ryan Tubridy and the 45th edition overall.
  - A 44-year-old man, Stephen Silver, was charged with the capital murder of Detective Garda Colm Horkan, who was shot dead in Castlerea, County Roscommon on 17 June, and was remanded in custody to the Midlands Prison in Portlaoise to appear via video link before Harristown District Court on 4 December.

=== December ===
- 1 December
  - All non-essential retail shops, hair and beauty providers, gyms and leisure centres, cinemas, museums and galleries reopened after six weeks of closure.
  - The Government approved an advance purchase agreement for 875,000 doses of the COVID-19 vaccine produced by Moderna.
  - The Health Protection Surveillance Centre issued new guidance around visits to nursing homes from 7 December.
  - An outbreak of COVID-19 was confirmed at University Hospital Waterford.
- 4 December – Thousands of restaurants, cafés, gastropubs and hotel restaurants reopened after six weeks of closure.
- 5 December – Minister for Justice Helen McEntee announced that she was expecting a baby, which made her the first Cabinet member in the history of the State to announce her pregnancy while in office.
- 10 December – Christmas lights at Áras an Uachtaráin was turned on by President Michael D. Higgins and his wife Sabina Higgins.
- 11 December
  - Two primary schools in counties Laois and Mayo closed early for the Christmas holidays due to an increase in COVID-19 cases among students.
  - The An Post Irish Book of the Year for 2020 was awarded to Doireann Ní Ghríofa for her book "A Ghost in the Throat".
- 12 December – A bakery in Drogheda, County Louth closed temporarily after around 15 employees tested positive for COVID-19.
- 15 December – Minister for Health Stephen Donnelly announced the Government's National COVID-19 Vaccination Strategy, which outlines the country's high-level plan for safe, effective and efficient vaccination of the Republic of Ireland, while safeguarding continued provision of health and social care services.
- 16 December – All pupils at a primary school in Killorglin, County Kerry began to restrict their movements after 17 people tested positive for COVID-19.
- 17 December
  - The Taoiseach tested negative for COVID-19 following an announcement that he was restricting his movements after coming into close contact with French President Emmanuel Macron who have tested positive for COVID-19.
  - NPHET recommended to the Government that the period of relaxed COVID-19 restrictions from 18 December be shortened to the end of the year as COVID-19 cases rise.
  - Minister for Education Norma Foley announced that schools would not close early for Christmas—nor will they reopen later than planned after Christmas—as there is no evidence or recommendation from public health authorities to do so.
- 18 December
  - The State formally apologised after 36 years to Joanne Hayes for wrongly accusing her in 1984 of the murder of a baby and for the "appalling hurt and distress caused."
  - The Taoiseach announced that the Government is "very minded" to accept NPHET's advice for a pre-New Year closure of the hospitality sector and the re-imposition of inter-county travel restrictions.
  - Chief Medical Officer Tony Holohan warned that Ireland must take immediate action to stop the spread of COVID-19 over the Christmas period.
  - The Director-General of the Health Service Executive (HSE) Paul Reid announced that he expects to have hundreds of thousands of vaccine doses by the end of February 2021.
- 20 December
  - The Government agreed to impose a 48-hour suspension on flights from the United Kingdom from midnight following fears over the spread of a new strain of COVID-19, while ferries will be limited to freight travel.
  - Gardaí broke up an organised "car meet" of 800 people in more than 250 cars that breached COVID-19 regulations on the night of 19 December in Little Island, Cork.
- 21 December
  - The chair of the NPHET Irish Epidemiological Modelling Advisory Group Philip Nolan announced that a third wave of COVID-19 in Ireland is clearly underway.
  - The Garda Síochána announced it continues to detect breaches of COVID-19 regulations at licensed premises nationwide while a pub in the northwest of Ireland was given the first "Immediate Closure Order" by Gardaí under the COVID-19 Enforcement Powers Act 2020.
- 22 December
  - The Government agreed to move the entire country to Level 5 lockdown restrictions with a number of adjustments from Christmas Eve until 12 January 2021 at the earliest.
- 23 December
  - The chair of the NPHET Coronavirus Expert Advisory Group Cillian de Gascun announced that the new variant of COVID-19 in the United Kingdom is now present in the Republic of Ireland, based on a selection of samples analysed from the weekend.
  - All ministers in the Government began restricting their movements after it was announced that Minister for Agriculture, Food and the Marine Charlie McConalogue tested positive for COVID-19.
- 24 December – Restaurants, cafés, gastropubs, hairdressers, barbers and beauty salons closed again as Level 5 lockdown restrictions came into effect.
- 25 December – Chief Medical Officer Tony Holohan officially confirmed that the new variant of COVID-19 in the United Kingdom had been detected in the Republic of Ireland by whole genome sequencing at the National Virus Reference Laboratory in University College Dublin.
- 26 December – The first shipment of 10,000 Pfizer/BioNTech COVID-19 vaccines arrived in the Republic of Ireland.
- 27 December – A ban on inter-county travel and family gathering restrictions came into effect from midnight following the reintroduction of Level 5 restrictions.
- 29 December
  - A 79-year-old woman became the first person in the Republic of Ireland to receive the Pfizer/BioNTech COVID-19 vaccine at St. James's Hospital, Dublin.
  - A new president and vice-president of the Garda Representative Association (GRA) were elected to their positions during a controversial online annual delegate meeting.
  - Pope Francis appointed Dermot Farrell as the new Archbishop of Dublin as Diarmuid Martin began his retirement from the role.
- 30 December
  - The Government agreed to move the entire country to full Level 5 lockdown restrictions from midnight until 31 January 2021 at the earliest.
  - An investigation got underway after a man was shot dead by Gardaí in West Dublin.
- 31 December
  - The HSE announced that close contacts of confirmed cases of COVID-19 are no longer being advised to get tested due to current widespread levels of infection.
  - Around 200 people attended a protest outside Blanchardstown Garda Station after a 27-year-old man, named locally as George Nkencho, was shot dead by Gardaí on 30 December.

== Sport ==
=== Association football ===
International friendly match

- 12 November – England 3–0 Ireland

Nations League

- 3 September – Bulgaria 1–1 Ireland
- 6 September – Ireland 0–1 Finland
- 11 October – Ireland 0–0 Wales
- 14 October – Finland 1–0 Ireland
- 15 November – Wales 1–0 Ireland
- 18 November – Ireland 0–0 Bulgaria

Euro 2020 playoff

- 8 October – Slovakia 0–0 aet (pso: 4–2) Ireland

== Deaths ==
=== January ===
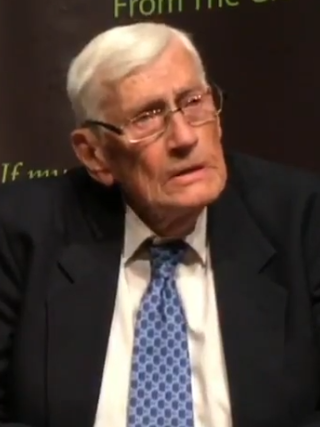
Seamus Mallon

- 2 January – Marian Finucane, 69, broadcaster.
- 7 January
  - Larry Gogan, 85, broadcaster.
  - Pat Collins, rock and jazz fiddler.
- 9 January - Breandán Ó Madagáin, 87, scholar, writer and celticist.
- 11 January – Matty Maher, 80, pub owner, lung cancer.
- 14 January – Tom Kelly, journalist and RTÉ News correspondent, cancer.
- 19 January – Joe Steve Ó Neachtain, 77, writer, actor, playwright and broadcaster.
- 21 January – Patrick Kennedy, 78, politician, Senator (1981–1982, 1983–1993), short illness.
- 24 January – Seamus Mallon, 83, politician, Senator (1982–1983), MLA (1998–2003) and Deputy First Minister of Northern Ireland (1998–2001).
- 30 January – Joe Millea, 78, hurler (Graigue-Ballycallan, Kilkenny senior team, Leinster).

=== February ===
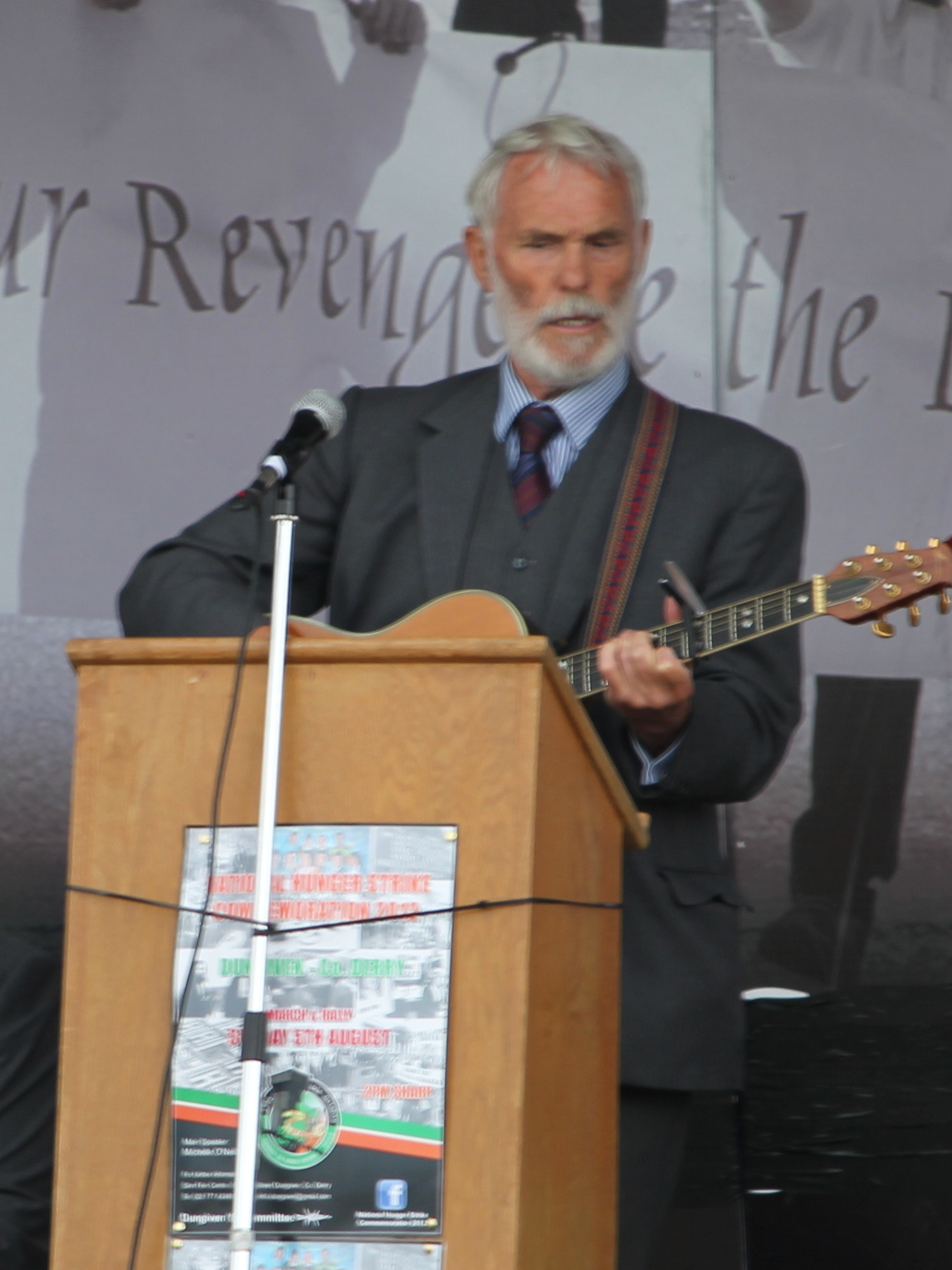
Francie Brolly

- 3 February – Marese Skehan, general election candidate (Tipperary).
- 5 February – Eamonn Boyce, 94, IRA volunteer.
- 6 February - Francie Brolly, 82, musician and politician, MLA (2003–2010).
- 8 February
  - Paddy Broderick, 80, jockey.
  - Keelin Shanley, 51, broadcaster, cancer.
- 9 February – Paul Kelly, 62, charity founder.
- 11 February – Jim Cullinan, 77, hurler (Newmarket-on-Fergus, Clare).
- 14 February
  - Garrett Fitzgerald, 65, rugby union player (University College Cork, Cork Constitution), coach and administrator (Munster), illness.
  - Jimmy Conway, 73, footballer (Fulham, Portland Timbers, national team).
- 20 February – Eamon Long, 81, hurler (Scariff, Faughs, Clare).
- 23 February - Des Smyth, musician and singer, illness.

=== March ===
- 2 March – Farrell McElgunn, 88, politician, Senator (1965–1973) and MEP (1973).
- 3 March – Úna O'Connor, 83, camogie player (Celtic, Dublin).
- 7 March – Frank Hogan, 81, born-again Christian.
- 9 March - Barney Eastwood, 87, boxing promoter, short illness.
- 24 March – Hugh Conaghan, 93, politician, TD (1977–1989).
- 26 March – John O'Leary, 70, golfer, long illness.
- 27 March – Frank Larkin, 48, disability rights activist, illness.
- 28 March – Conor Connelly, 44, Gaelic footballer (St. Jude's, Roscommon).
- 30 March – Alfie Monk, 86, Gaelic footballer (St. Patrick's, Meath, Louth).
- 31 March – Mary Buckley-Clarke, 73, writer, poet and songwriter, leukaemia.

=== April ===
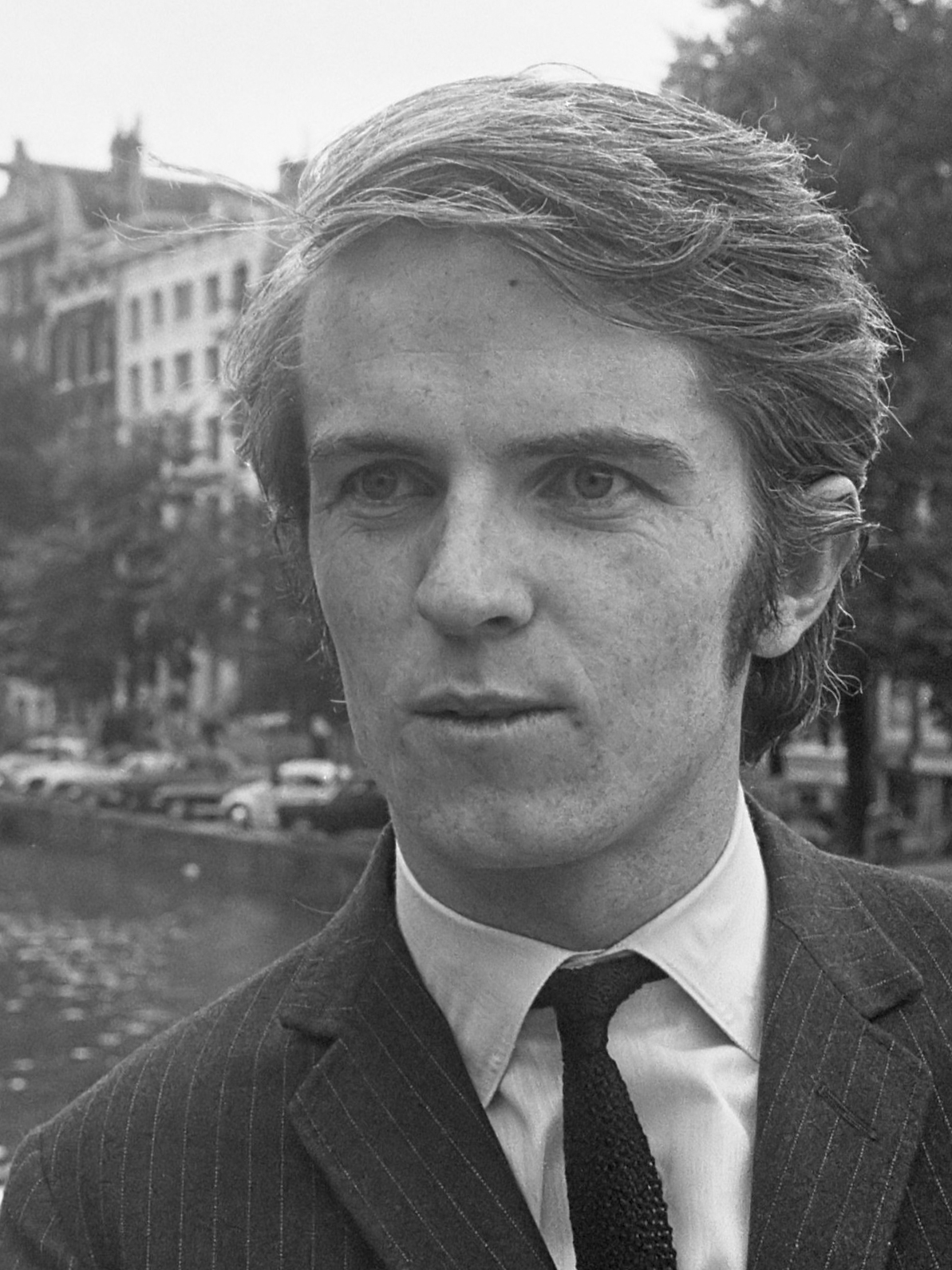
Ronan O'Rahilly

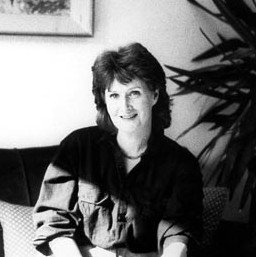
Eavan Boland

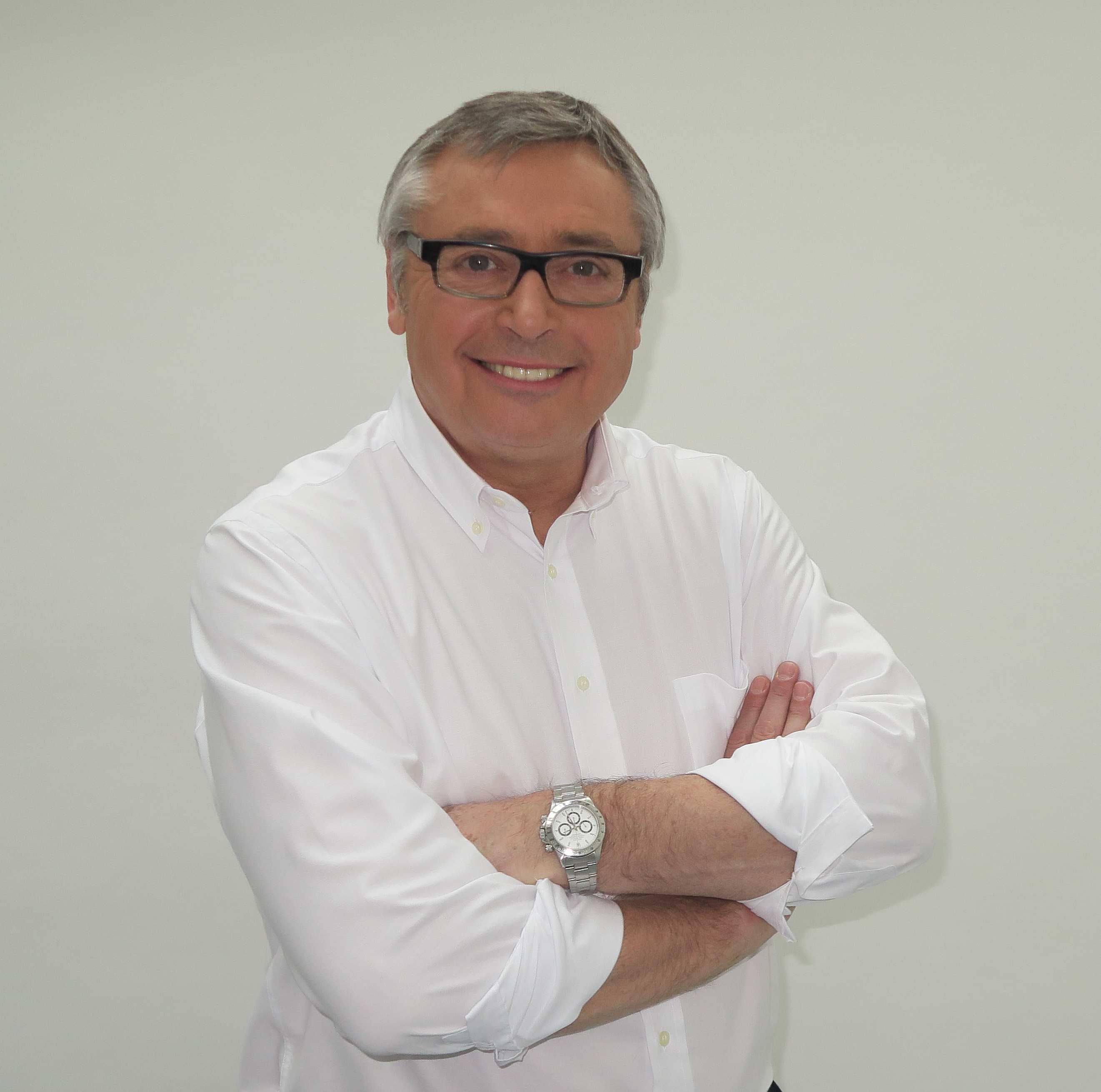
Michael Robinson

- 5 April – Tom Larkin, 88, hurler and Gaelic footballer (Kilsheelan-Kilcash, Tipperary).
- 7 April – Tom Scully, 89, Gaelic football manager (Offaly), COVID-19.
- 9 April – Norah Gibbons, 68, children's rights activist.
- 13 April – Shay Keogh, 85, footballer (Shamrock Rovers, Dundalk, St Patrick's Athletic F.C., national team).
- 14 April – Danny Delaney, Gaelic footballer (Stradbally, Laois), COVID-19.
- 20 April – Tom Mulholland, 84, Gaelic footballer (Kilkerley Emmets, Louth, Leinster), COVID-19.
- 20 April – Ronan O'Rahilly, 79, businessman and show-business manager, vascular dementia.
- 21 April – Dave Bacuzzi, 79, English-born Irish-based footballer (Cork Hibernians, League of Ireland XI) and manager (Home Farm), COVID-19.
- 22 April – Oliver Gough, 84, hurler (Ferns St. Aidan's, Rathnure, Thomastown, Wexford, Kilkenny).
- 24 April – Tiede Herrema, 99, Dutch-born Irish-based businessman and IRA kidnap victim.
- 26 April – Laura Bernal, 64, Argentine Ambassador to Ireland, COVID-19.
- 27 April – Eavan Boland, 75, poet, author and academic, stroke.
- 28 April – Michael Robinson, 61, footballer (Manchester City, Liverpool, national team), melanoma.
- 29 April – Noel Walsh, 84, Gaelic footballer, manager and Gaelic games administrator, pneumonia resulting from COVID-19.
- 30 April – Billy Ringrose, 89, showjumper.

=== May ===
- 2 May
  - Tom Hardiman, 91, former Director-General of RTÉ.
  - Jonathan Kelly, 72, folk rock singer-songwriter.
  - Oliver Crewe, 73, Gaelic footballer (Clan na Gael, Armagh), COVID-19.
- 6 May – Paddy Molloy, 86, hurler (Drumcullen, Offaly, Leinster).
- 8 May – J. J. Cribbin, 73, Gaelic footballer (Ballyhaunis, Mayo), illness.
- 15 May
  - Paddy Fenning, 69, Gaelic footballer (Tullamore, Offaly, Leinster), motor neuron disease.
  - Tom O'Donoghue, 79, hurler (Sarsfields, Cork, Munster).
- 16 May – Gerard Brady, 83, politician, TD (1977–1992), Minister of State (1982) and Minister for Education (1982).
- 19 May – Larry Dunne, 72, convicted drug dealer.
- 21 May
  - John Murphy, 72, Gaelic footballer (Newry Shamrocks, Down).
  - Paddy Buckley, 75, Gaelic footballer (Maryland, Westmeath).
- 23 May – Michael Devine, 79, journalist, cancer.
- 27 May – Tony Scannell, 74, actor.
- 28 May – Brendan Bowyer, 81, singer.
- 30 May – Chick Gillen, 87, boxer.

=== June ===
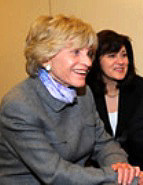
Jean Kennedy Smith

- 5 June – Betty Ann Norton, 83, drama teacher.
- 6 June – Lester Ryan, 61, hurler (Clara, Kilkenny, Leinster), traffic collision.
- 8 June – Tony Dunne, 78, footballer (Shelbourne, Manchester United, national team).
- 9 June – Jeanne Rynhart, 74, sculptor.
- 13 June – Mags Murray, 58, politician, Councillor (2004–2019).
- 16 June – John Joe Sheehan, 90, Gaelic footballer (Killarney Legion, Kerry, Munster).
- 17 June – Colm Horkan, 49, detective in the Garda Síochána, former footballer (Charlestown Sarsfields GAA).
- 18 June – Jean Kennedy Smith, 92, Irish-American diplomat and former US Ambassador to Ireland.
- 26 June – Theo Foley, 83, footballer (Home Farm, Charlton Athletic, national team) and assistant manager (Arsenal).

=== July ===
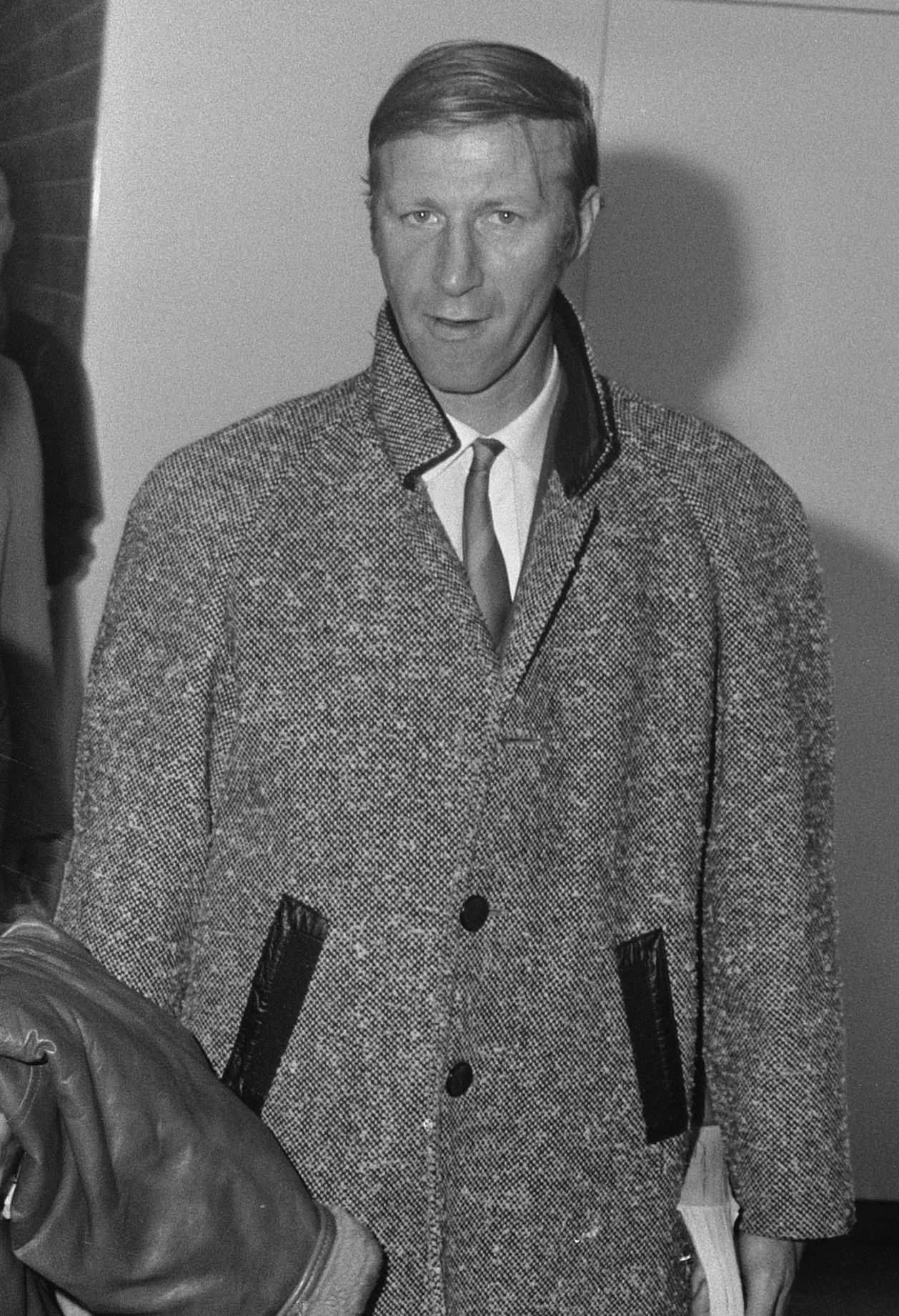
Jack Charlton

- 1 July – Tommy Ring, 81, hurler (Castlepollard, Kilmacud Crokes, Westmeath, Leinster).
- 2 July – Jack Harding, 87, hurler (Shelmaliers, Wexford).
- 10 July
  - Jack Charlton, 85, English footballer and manager of the Irish national team.
  - Johnny Cusack, 92, Gaelic footballer (Lavey, Cavan, Ulster).
  - Michael Cullen, 74, artist, long illness.
- 14 July
  - Michael Quinn, 80, journalist (Irish Independent).
  - Christine Keegan, 81, Stardust fire campaigner.
- 15 July
  - Kieran O'Connor, 41, Gaelic footballer (Aghada, Cork), bone cancer.
  - Séamus Sexton, 69, bowler.
- 19 July – Ruth Morrissey, 39, CervicalCheck campaigner, cancer.
- 22 July – Tom Mitchell, 88, republican and politician.

=== August ===
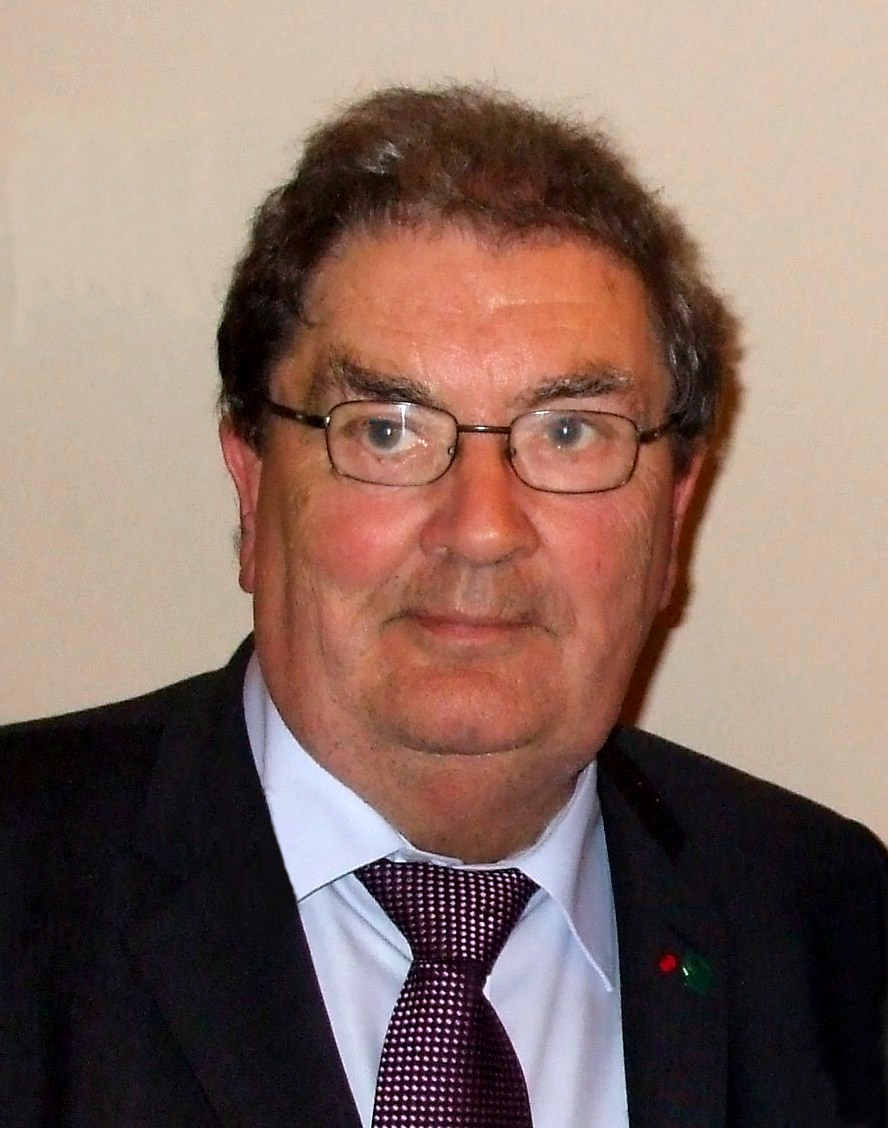
John Hume

- 3 August – John Hume, 83, politician, Leader of the SDLP (1979–2001), MEP (1979–2001) and Nobel Peace Prize laureate (1998), dementia.
- 9 August
  - Brendan Halligan, 84, economist and politician, Senator (1973–1976), TD (1976–1977) and MEP (1983–1984).
  - Michael Coyne, 75, veteran of the Vietnam War.
- 10 August
  - P. J. Sheehan, 87, politician, TD (1981–2002, 2007–2011).
  - Paddy Doyle, 79, hurler (Thurles Sarsfields, Tipperary) and manager (Thurles Sarsfields, Borris-Ileigh, Moycarkey-Borris, Laois).
- 16 August – Tommy Carroll, 77, footballer (Shelbourne, Birmingham City, national team).
- 19 August – Jim O'Brien, 74, hurler (Bruree, Limerick, Munster).
- 20 August – Desmond Guinness, 88, author and conservationist.
- 23 August – Frank Dunphy, 82, business manager, entrepreneur and accountant.
- 27 August – Eugene McCabe, 90, author and playwright.

=== September ===
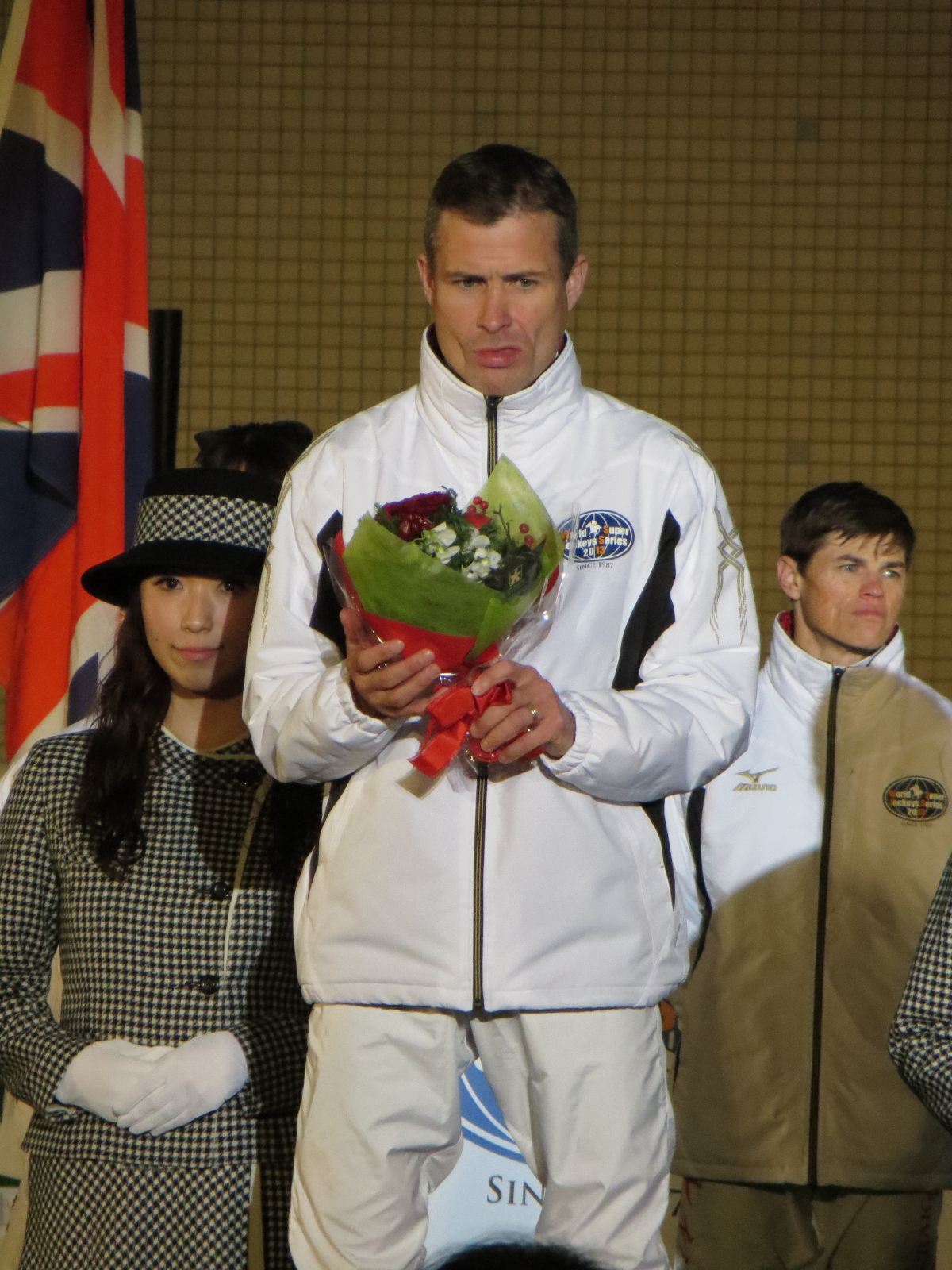
Pat Smullen

- 3 September – Michael J. Cleary, 95, Roman Catholic prelate, Bishop of Banjul (1981–2006).
- 4 September – Mike Cooley, 86, engineer, writer and trade union leader.
- 5 September – Jimmy Lavin, 92, Gaelic footballer and hurler (St. Vincent's, Dublin).
- 15 September – Pat Smullen, 43, jockey, pancreatic cancer.
- 27 September - Billy Dwyer, 86, hurler (Faughs, Kilkenny).

=== October ===
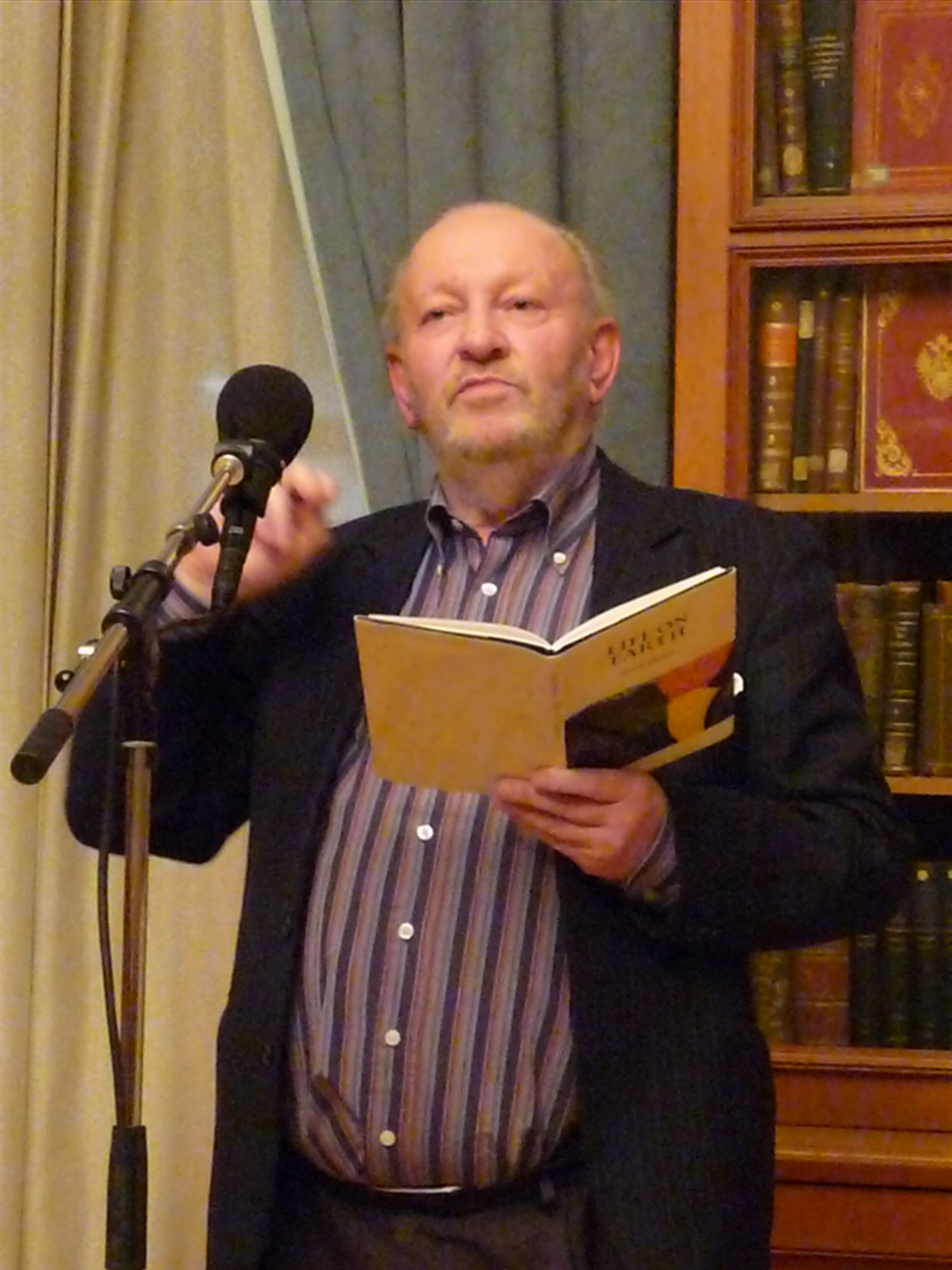
Derek Mahon

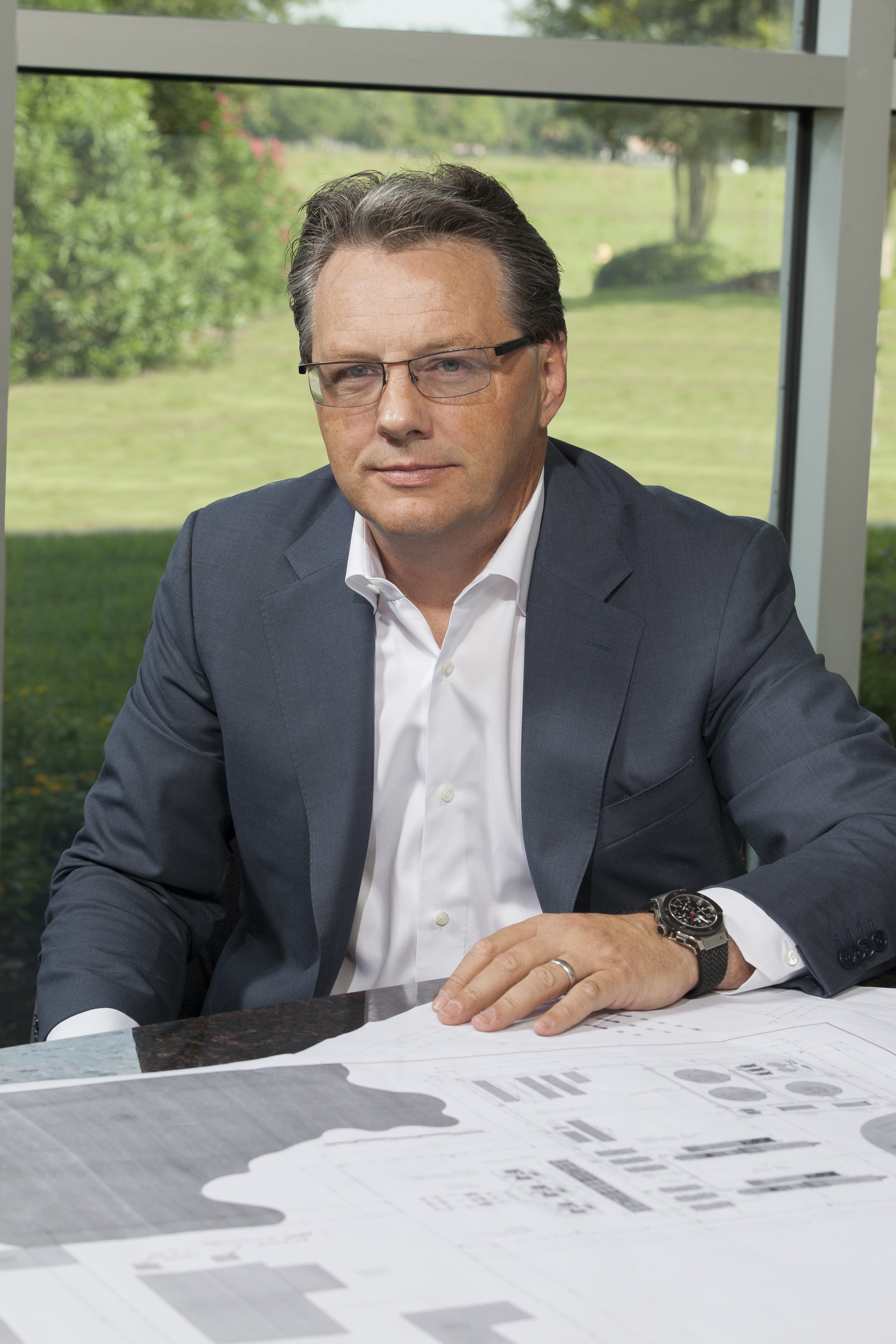
John J. Campion

- 1 October
  - Derek Mahon, 78, poet.
  - Robbie Brunton, 47, footballer (Sligo Rovers, Coleraine, Bohemians).
- 2 October – John Joseph Campion, 57, entrepreneur.
- 5 October – Tommy Cullen, 81, Gaelic footballer (Edenderry, Offaly).
- 6 October – Margaret Mac Curtain, 91, historian and writer.
- 8 October
  - Tom O'Donnell, 94, politician, TD (1961–1987), Minister for the Gaeltacht (1973–1977) and MEP (1979–1984).
  - Fergus McCabe, 71, social worker and community activist.
- 9 October – Pat Hooper, 68, athlete, heart attack.
- 11 October – Paddy Doyle, 69, writer and disability activist.
- 15 October – Terry Kearns, 75, Gaelic footballer (Meath).
- 27 October – Julia Ó Faoláin, 88, writer.
- 30 October – Robert Fisk, 74, English-born journalist.

=== November ===
- 5 November
  - Vincent Coakley, 65, Gaelic footballer (Millstreet, Cork).
  - Dave Roche, 97, Gaelic footballer (Fermoy, Cork, Munster).
- 6 November
  - Paul Carey, 41, hurler (Patrickswell, Limerick).
  - Fergus O'Kelly, 88, actor, musician and singer.
- 7 November
  - Adrian Cahill, 49, hurler (Birr, Offaly).
  - Brian Coll, 79, country music singer, heart attack.
  - Tim Slevin, 91, hurler (Leitrim).
- 12 November – Tommy Butler, 69, hurler (Drom-Inch, Tipperary senior team, Munster).
- 16 November – Jim Culliton, 86, businessman.
- 22 November – Maurice Setters, 83, English-born football assistant manager (national team).
- 24 November – Harry Ryan, 63, hurler (Clara, Kilkenny).
- 25 November – Denis Heaslip, 87, hurler (Knocktopher, Kilkenny).

=== December ===
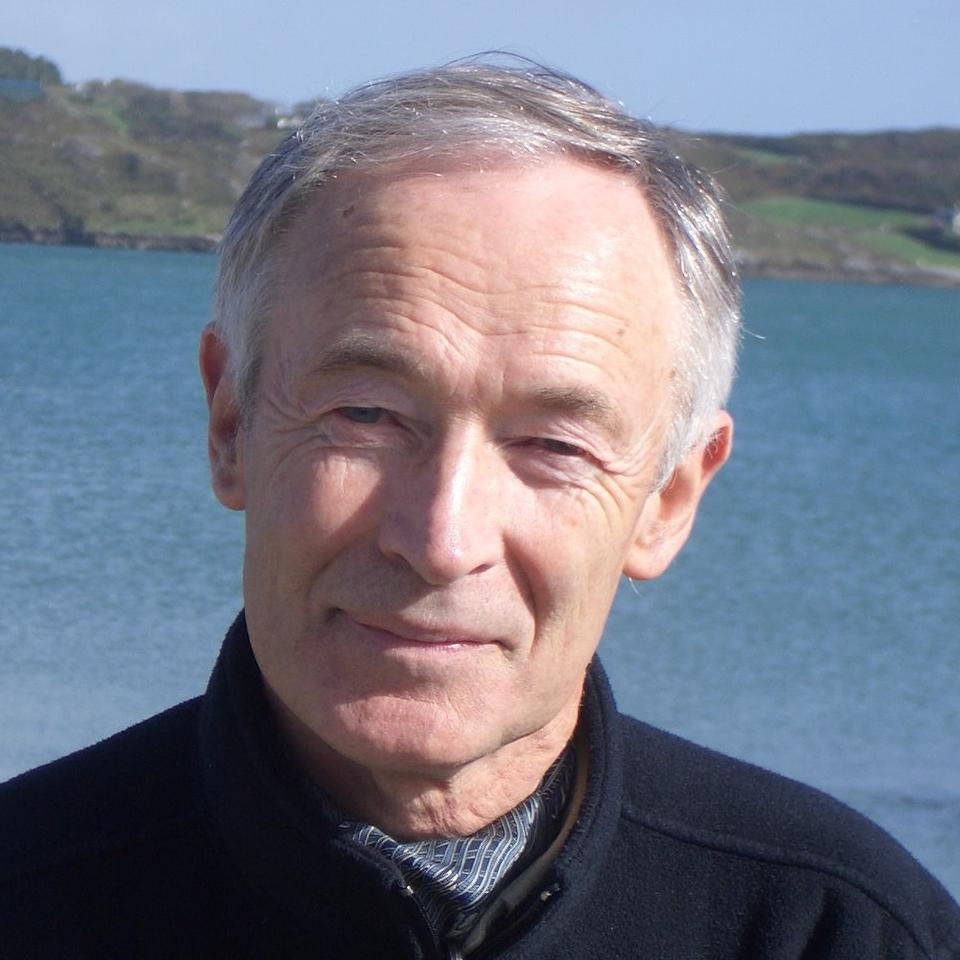
Tim Severin

- 3 December – Paudie Fitzgerald, 87, cyclist.
- 17 December – Jim Fives, 91, hurler (Tourin, Waterford, Galway).
- 18 December
  - John Harbison, 84, former State Pathologist.
  - Tim Severin, 80, Irish-based British filmmaker and explorer.
- 21 December
  - Joe Cuddy, 80, singer and entertainer who scored number-one hit in Ireland in 1974 with his version of "Any Dream Will Do".
- 29 December – Jerry O'Riordan, 81, Gaelic footballer (Glenbeigh-Glencar, Mid Kerry, Kerry).
- 30 December – Victor Stacey, 76, Church of Ireland clergyman.
