= John Campion =

John Campion may refer to:

- John Joseph Campion, Irish-American entrepreneur
- John Campion (politician), English politician and police and crime commissioner
- John F. Campion, mine-owner in Leadville, Colorado

== See also ==
- John Champion (disambiguation)
