= Gary Cahill (hurler) =

Irish hurler (born 1968)

Personal information
- Native name: Garraí Ó Cathail (Irish)
- Born: 23 April 1968 (age 58) Birr, County Offaly, Ireland

Sport
- Sport: Hurling
- Position: Right wing-back
Club
- Years: Club
- Birr
Club titles
- Offaly titles: 8
- Leinster titles: 6
- All-Ireland Titles: 4
Inter-county*
Years	County	Apps (scores)
1988-1997	Offaly	6 (1-1)
Inter-county titles
- Leinster titles: 0
- All-Irelands: 0
- NHL: 0
- All Stars: 0
- *Inter County team apps and scores correct as of 18:09, 29 June 2014.

Gary Cahill (born 23 April 1968) is an Irish retired hurler who played as a right wing-back for the Offaly senior team.

Born in Birr, County Offaly, Cahill first played competitive hurling in his youth. He first came to prominence on the inter-county scene when he first linked up with the Offaly minor team, before later joining the under-21 side. He made his senior debut during the 1988-89 National League and immediately became a regular member of the team.

At club level Cahill is a four-time All-Ireland medallist with Birr. In addition to this he also won six Leinster medals and eight championship medals.

His retirement came following the conclusion of the 1997 championship.

Cahill's brother, Adrian, also enjoyed an inter-county career with Offaly.

== Honours ==
=== Team ===
Birr

- All-Ireland Senior Club Hurling Championship (2): 1995, 1998
- Leinster Senior Club Hurling Championship (6): 1991, 1994, 1997, 1999, 2001, 2002
- Offaly Senior Club Hurling Championship (8): 1991, 1994, 1997, 1999, 2000, 2001, 2002, 2003

Offaly

- Leinster Under-21 Hurling Championship (1): 1989
- All-Ireland Minor Hurling Championship (1): 1986
- Leinster Minor Hurling Championship (1): 1986
