= Vincent Coakley =

Irish Gaelic footballer (1955–2020)

Personal information
- Native name: Uinseann Mac Caochlaoich (Irish)
- Born: 1955 Aghinagh, County Cork, Ireland
- Died: 5 November 2020 (aged 65) Macroom, County Cork, Ireland

Sport
- Sport: Gaelic Football
- Position: Midfield
Clubs
- Years: Club
- Aghinagh; Millstreet; Muskerry
Club titles
- Cork titles: 0
Inter-county
- Years: County
- 1976–1980: Cork
Inter-county titles
- Munster titles: 0
- All-Irelands: 0
- NFL: 1
- All Stars: 0

Vincent Coakley (1955 – 5 November 2020) was an Irish Gaelic footballer. At club level he played with Aghinagh, Millstreet and Muskerry and was a National League winner with the Cork senior football team.

== Playing career ==
A member of the Aghinagh club, Coakley first came to prominence when he was drafted onto the Cork minor football team. He won a Munster Championship medal in this grade in 1973, before later having two unsuccessful years with the under-21 team. Coakley joined the Cork senior team during the 1976 Munster Championship and made his debut two years later in the Munster final against Kerry. He won a National League medal in 1980 in what was his last season with the team.

== Honours ==
Cork

- National Football League (1): 1979–80
- Munster Minor Football Championship (1): 1973
