= John Champion =

John Champion may refer to:

- John C. Champion (1923–1994), American producer and screenwriter
- John E. Champion (1922–2002), President of Florida State University
- John George Champion (1815–1854), English soldier, botanist, and explorer
- Jon Champion (born 1965), English association football commentator
