= Norah Gibbons =

Advocate for children (1952–2020)

- Born: 6 June 1952
- Died: 8 April 2020 (aged 67)
- Education: University College Galway
- Occupation(s): Social worker, children's rights advocate
- Known for: Advocacy for children

Norah Gibbons (6 June 1952 – 8 April 2020), was the Director of Advocacy at Barnardos, Director and chair of Alcohol Action Ireland and was selected to be on the Commission to Inquire into Child Abuse. Gibbons was the first chair of the Department of Children and Youth Affairs (Tusla). Gibbons trained as a social worker completing her degree with University College Galway in 1973 and completing a Higher Diploma in Education in 1974. She joined Barnardos in the 1990s. She remained in the management there going on to have responsibilities for the children's services until she served as a director of advocacy for the charity from 2005 until 2012. She was the founding chair of Tusla from 2014 until 2018 as well as a member of the commission to inquire into child abuse. She co-chaired the Independent Child Death Review. She was appointed the independent specialist on the in-depth research study on familicide and domestic homicide. Gibbons also worked as the independent chairwoman for the Northern Ireland Executive’s working group on child abuse until she had to resign due to ill health. Her career was to advocate for the rights of children. She died on 8 April 2020.
