= Adrian Cahill =

Irish hurler (1971–2020)

Personal information
- Native name: Ódreáin Ó Cathail (Irish)
- Born: 9 June 1971 Birr, County Offaly, Ireland
- Died: 7 November 2020 (aged 49) Lanzarote, Spain
- Height: 5 ft 10 in (178 cm)

Sport
- Sport: Hurling
- Position: Right wing-back
Club
- Years: Club
- Birr
Club titles
- Offaly titles: 2
- Leinster titles: 2
- All-Ireland Titles: 1
Inter-county*
Years	County	Apps (scores)
1989–1993	Offaly	3 (0–00)
Inter-county titles
- Leinster titles: 1
- All-Irelands: 0
- NHL: 1
- All Stars: 0
- *Inter County team apps and scores correct as of 17:19, 29 June 2014.

Adrian Cahill (9 June 1971 – 7 November 2020) was an Irish hurler who played as a right wing-back for the Offaly senior team.

Born in Birr, County Offaly, Cahill first played competitive hurling in his youth. He first came to prominence on the inter-county scene at the age of sixteen when he first linked up with the Offaly minor team, before later joining the under-21 side. He made his senior debut during the 1989–90 National League and immediately became a regular member of the team. During his career Cahill won a set of Leinster and National Hurling League medals as a non-playing substitute.

At club level Cahill is a one-time All-Ireland medallist with Birr. In addition to this he also won two Leinster medals and one championship medal.

His retirement came during the 1993–94 National League.

Cahill's brother, Gary, also enjoyed a lengthy career with Offaly.

== Honours ==
=== Team ===
Birr

- All-Ireland Senior Club Hurling Championship (1): 1995
- Leinster Senior Club Hurling Championship (2): 1991, 1994
- Offaly Senior Club Hurling Championship (2): 1991, 1994

Offaly

- Leinster Senior Hurling Championship (1): 1990
- National Hurling League (1): 1990-91
- Leinster Under-21 Hurling Championship (1): 1989
- All-Ireland Minor Hurling Championship (2): 1987, 1989
- Leinster Minor Hurling Championship (2): 1987, 1989
