= Samuel McConkey =

- Education: Trinity College Dublin
- Occupation: Physician
- Organization(s): Royal College of Surgeons in Ireland, Beaumont Hospital, Dublin
- Known for: COVID-19 pandemic in the Republic of Ireland

Sam McConkey (full name: Samuel Joseph McConkey) is an Irish doctor specialising in internal medicine, tropical medicine, and infectious disease.

== Background ==
Sam McConkey was born in the Erne Hospital in Enniskillen, County Fermanagh, to George and Margaret McConkey. His mother was from County Londonderry and worked as a primary school teacher in Roslea in the south-east of County Fermanagh. His father was a farmer. McConkey was raised on the family farm at Killeevan, a hamlet located between Clones and Newbliss in the west of County Monaghan. He received his secondary education at Monaghan Collegiate School in Monaghan Town. He is a church elder at the Presbyterian church in Clontarf.

== Career ==
McConkey attended medical school at Trinity College, Dublin (TCD), graduating in 1989. McConkey obtained Membership of the Royal College of Physicians of Ireland (MRCPI) in 1992 followed by a Diploma in Tropical Medicine and Hygiene from Liverpool School of Tropical Medicine in 1993. He completed specialist training in 2000 and underwent fellowship training at Washington University School of Medicine, including a Masters in Statistics. He became a Wellcome Trust research fellow in 2001, completing a Doctor of Medicine research degree (MD) at Trinity College Dublin in 2002. McConkey undertook a clinical fellowship at the Nuffield Department of Clinical Medicine at the University of Oxford. He was seconded to the Medical Research Council Laboratories in The Gambia. From 2001 to 2005, he was an Honorary Consultant in Infectious Diseases at Oxford University Hospitals NHS Foundation Trust.

In 2006, he became a Fellow of the Royal College of Physicians of Ireland and Fellow of the Royal College of Physicians (UK). He is a consultant physician at Beaumont Hospital, Dublin, and Our Lady of Lourdes Hospital, Drogheda.

McConkey is professor of medicine, Deputy Dean for International Curriculum Development, and head of the Department of International Health and Tropical Medicine at the Royal College of Surgeons in Ireland. He is a former board member of the Health Information and Quality Authority and currently serves on the Scientific Advisory Committee of the European Vaccine Initiative.
