= Tom Mulholland (Gaelic footballer) =

Gaelic footballer (1936–2020)

Personal information
- Born: 8 March 1936
- Died: 20 April 2020 (aged 84) Our Lady of Lourdes Hospital, Drogheda, County Louth
- Occupation: Dairy farmer

Sport
Club
- Years: Club
- Kilkerley Emmets
Inter-county
- Years: County
- Louth

Tom Mulholland (8 March 1936 – 20 April 2020) was a Gaelic footballer. He played senior football for Kilkerley Emmets, Louth and Leinster. He was also honorary president of the Kilkerley Emmets club.

Mulholland lived in the village of Kilkerley, near Dundalk, where he was a dairy farmer. He had six sisters and one brother. He was married in 1968 and had eight children. Some of his children played football and camogie at various levels. Mulholland pursued his involvement in athletics until he was in his seventies.

After an outbreak of COVID-19 at Dealgan House Nursing Home (where he resided), during the COVID-19 pandemic in the Republic of Ireland, Mulholland was admitted to Our Lady of Lourdes Hospital in Drogheda where he died on 20 April 2020.
