= List of road traffic accidents deaths in the Republic of Ireland by year =

Official traffic collision statistics in the Republic of Ireland are compiled by the Road Safety Authority (RSA) using data supplied by the Garda Síochána (police). While related data is collected by other organisations, including the National Roads Authority, local authorities, and the Health Service Executive, these are not factored into RSA statistics. The RSA defines a road traffic fatality as "one where death occurs within 30 days of the date of the collision and is not the result of a medical cause or that of a deliberate act (e.g. suicide)."

== Road traffic collision deaths and injuries ==
Road traffic collision deaths and injuries
Year	Deaths	Injuries	Serious Injuries (Note: 'The definition of "serious injury" is an injury for which the person is detained in hospital as an in-patient, or any of the following injuries whether or not detained in hospital: fractures, concussion, internal injuries, crushings, severe cuts and lacerations, severe general shock requiring medical treatment.')	Ref
1911	69 (Note: The 1911 and 1912 numbers are for fatal accidents rather than deaths. They have been extracted from all-island returns.) (Note: Of which 20 vehicles were mechanically propelled and 49 horse-drawn.)			
1912	75 (Note: Of which 28 vehicles were mechanically propelled and 47 horse-drawn.)			
1922	51 (Note: The 1922–26 figures are for fatal collisions rather than deaths.) (Note: The 1922–26 figures are for collisions caused by motor cars and horse-drawn vehicles only.)	583		
1923	75	701		
1924	64	725		
1925	96	973		
1926	130	1,148		
1929 (Note: Year ending 1 September 1929.)	106 (Note: Deaths caused by motor cars and buses only.)			
1931	184	2,870		
1932	202	2,934		
1933	185	2,747		
1934	199	2,934		
1935	222	3,388		
1936	201	3,534		
1937	214	4,247		
1938	227	5,516		
1939	192	4,989		
1940	204	3,929		
1941	156	2,609		
1942	176	1,881		
1943	110	1,455		
1944	130	1,408		
1945	115	1,679		
1946	166	2,861		
1947	195	3,294		
1948	201	3,836		
1949	213	3,941		
1950	213	4,452		
1951	251	4,471		
1952	222	4,208		
1953	257	4,476		
1954	267	4,769		
1955	282	5,200		
1956	313	5,027		
1957	274	4,328		
1958	269	4,442		
1959	306	4,489		
1960	302	5,451		
1961	332	5,092		
1962	340	5,160		
1963	335	4,422		
1964 (Note: A driving test was required from 1964 for issue of new driving licences.)	341	4,864		
1965	356	5,311		
1966	382	5,030		
1967	416	5,694		
1968	447	9,716		
1969	462	9,566		
1970	540	9,269		
1971	576	9,629		
1972	640	8,955		
1973	592	8,762		
1974	594	8,288		
1975	586	7,198		
1976	525	7,798		
1977	583	8,515		
1978	628	9,313		
1979 (Note: In autumn 1979 a backlog of driving tests was cleared by awarding licences without a test to about 45,000 learners.)	614	8,250		
1980	564	8,509		
1981	572	8,283		
1982	533	8,006		
1983	535	7,946		
1984	465	8,210	(Note: "Figure 4: Number of Serious Injury Collisions, 1984-2012" (RSA 2016 p.4) graphs a related number (collisions rather than persons))	
1985	410	7,818		
1986	387	8,329		
1987	462	8,409		
1988	463	8,437		
1989	460	8,803		
1990	478	9,429		
1991	445	9,874		
1992	415	10,188		
1993	431	9,831		
1994	404	10,229		
1995	437	12,673		
1996	453	13,319		
1997	472	13,115	2,182	
1998	458	12,773	1,916	
1999	413	12,340	1,867	
2000 (Note: The National Car Test was introduced in 2000 for roadworthiness of older vehicles.)	415	12,043	1,640	
2001	411	10,222	1,417	
2002 (Note: Penalty points for road traffic offences were introduced on 31 October 2002.)	376	9,206	1,150	
2003	335	8,262	1,009	
2004	374	7,867	877	
2005	396	9,318	1,021	
2006	365	8,575	907	
2007	338	7,806	860	
2008	279	9,758	835 / 610 (Note: Where two figures are given for serious injuries, the first is from RSA Road Safety, Research and Driver Education 2017 and the second from RSA Research Department 2016)	
2009	238	9,742	640 / 453	
2010	212	8,270	561 / 388	
2011	186	7,235	472 / 333	
2012	161 (Note: Figure revised October 2016.)	7,942	474 / 300	
2013	190	6,880	508 / 318	
2014 (Note: Data collection was automated in 2014 via the PULSE system.)	193	8,079	758	
2015	165	7,840	825	
2016	185	7,773	965	
2017	156	7,800	1,052	
2018	138	8,004	1,359	
2019	140	8,149	1,506	
2020	146	5,745	1,145	
2021	130	6,198	1,360	
2022	155	7,302	1,424	
2023	184	6,949	1,458	
2024	174 (Note: An initial figure of 179 was reported but this was revised down to 174 due to a recategorisation of some deaths.)			
2025	188			
2026	123 (Note: As of 18 August 2026)			

Footnotes

== See also ==
- Mary Ward (1827–1869), the first person known to have been killed by a motor vehicle, in Parsonstown (current day Birr), County Offaly, Ireland
