= Oliver Crewe =

Armagh Gaelic footballer (1947–2020)

Personal information
- Native name: Oilibhéar de Criú (Irish)
- Nickname: The quiet man
- Born: 27 February 1947 Lurgan, Northern Ireland
- Died: 2 May 2020 (aged 73) Dundalk, Republic of Ireland

Sport
- Sport: Gaelic football
- Position: Right wing-back
Clubs
- Years: Club
- Clan na Gael; Dowdallshill
Club titles
- Armagh titles: 7
- Ulster titles: 3
- All-Ireland Titles: 0
Inter-county
- Years: County
- 1968-1974: Armagh
Inter-county titles
- Ulster titles: 0
- All-Irelands: 0
- NFL: 0
- All Stars: 0

Oliver Crewe (27 February 1947 – 2 May 2020) was a Gaelic footballer who played for the Clan na Gael and Dowdallshill clubs and at senior level for the Armagh county team.

== Career ==
Crewe first came to Gaelic football prominence as a schoolboy with St Paul's Junior High School, which subsequently formed the backbone of the Clan na Gael club team. After progressing through the underage ranks to the senior team, Crewe was a member of the Clan team that lost the 1974 All-Ireland club final to University College Dublin. His other honours at club level include three Ulster Club Championships and seven Armagh SFC titles. Crewe first appeared on the inter-county scene with the Armagh minor football team. He spent a number of seasons with the senior team between 1968 and 1974. Crewe ended his playing days with the Dowdallshill club.

== Death ==
Crewe died from COVID-19 at Dealgan House Nursing Home in Dundalk on 2 May 2020, aged 73.

== Honours ==
Clan na Gael

- Ulster Senior Club Football Championship: 1972, 1973, 1974
- Armagh Senior Football Championship: 1968, 1969, 1971, 1972, 1973, 1974, 1976
- Armagh Intermediate Football Championship: 1965
