= John Joseph Campion =

Irish-American entrepreneur (1963–2020)

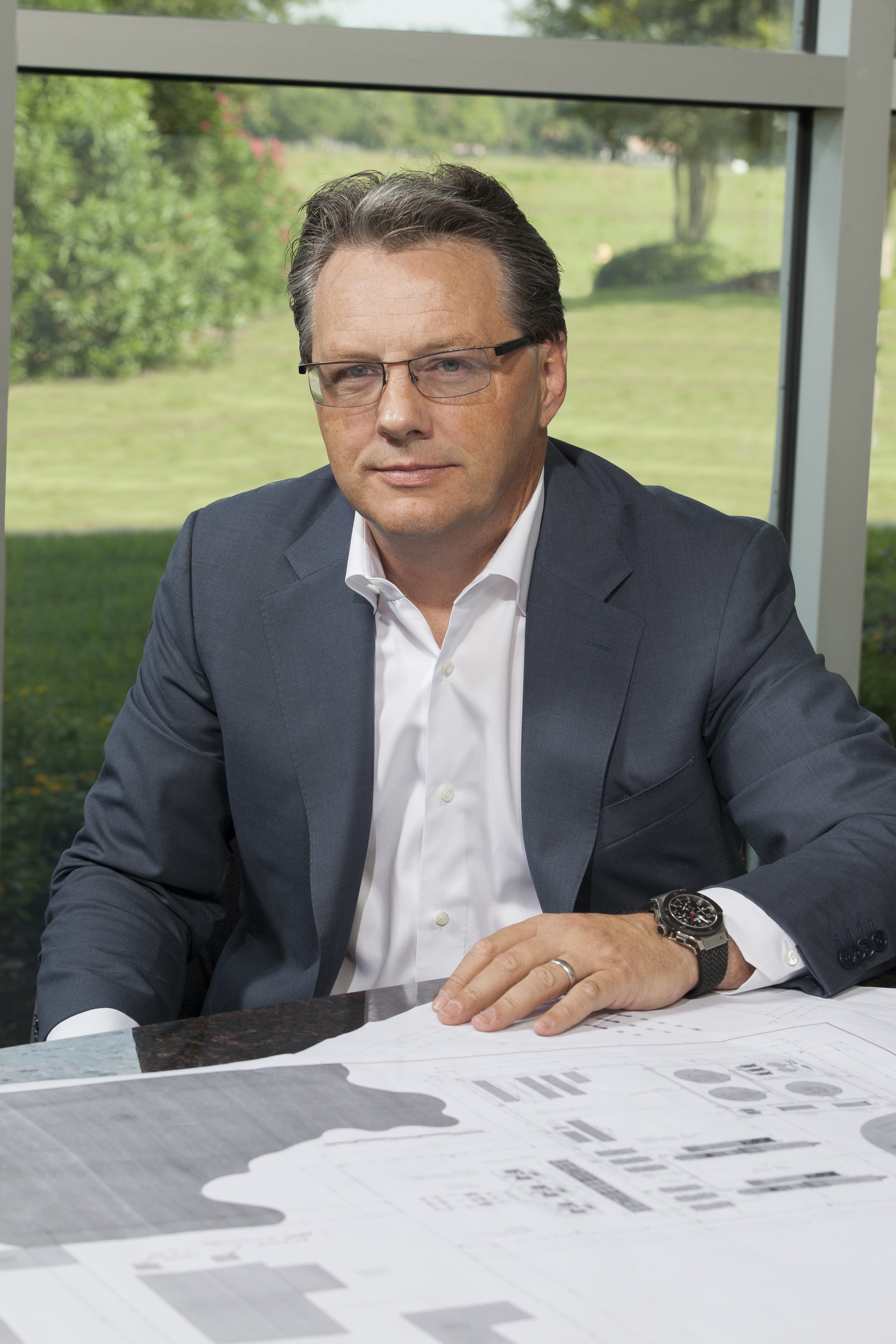
John J. Campion, Executive Chairman of APR Energy

John Joseph Campion (January 17, 1963 – October 2, 2020) was an Irish-American entrepreneur. In 1987, he founded Showpower, Inc., a California company that provided portable generators for the Rolling Stones, U2, Kiss and AC/DC. Campion served as chairman and chief executive officer of APR Energy plc (LSE: APR).

== Early life ==
Born in Cork, Ireland, Campion was held back in primary school twice, failed secondary school exams, and did not attend college. At age 21, Campion emigrated to the United States with an airline ticket and $25 in his possession.

== Corporate leadership ==
Under the leadership of Campion, APR Energy specialized in the rapid deployment of electrical power-generating plants in areas of the world that have been struck by natural disasters or that are experiencing a shortage of energy. The modular power plants are typically constructed in a few months. Campion held several patents for this technology. One such plant was assembled in 45 days following the 2011 earthquake and tsunami in Japan, a task that would normally require from three to four years to complete for a permanent power plant installation. It took APR Energy less than a month to deploy a power plant in Cyprus with the equivalent generating capacity to power approximately 120,000 American homes.

Other projects have been undertaken in Uruguay, Yemen, Senegal, Argentina, Libya and Botswana, among other countries. The company has received numerous awards for its technology.

From zero revenues at its founding, APR Energy has grown to $486 million in revenues, projected for 2014. The company employs more than 150 people in Jacksonville and over 850 internationally. In 2014, the company was valued at $1.2 billion.

Campion, who founded APR Energy, left his role as CEO in May 2019 to take over as the non-executive chairman for the APR board.

== The Campion Automotive Collection ==
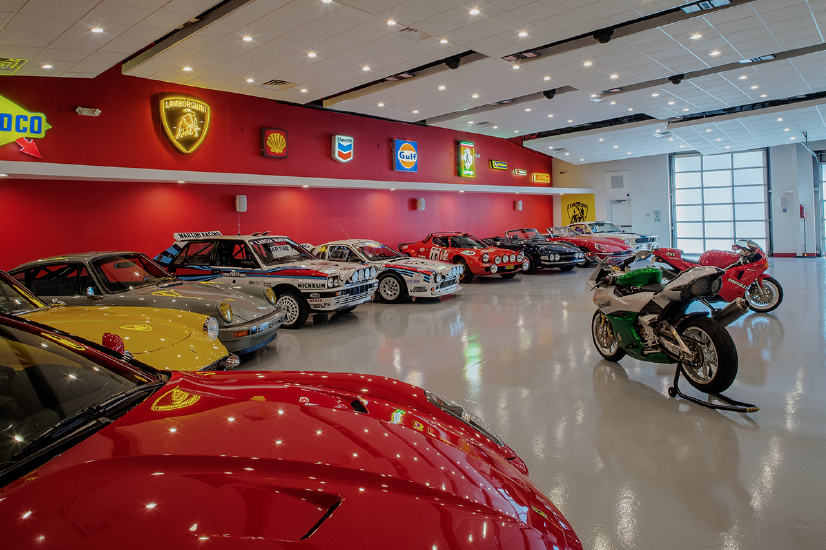
A portion of John J. Campion's car collection.

Campion assembled a stable of Lancias. His collection includes seven models that have each raced in the World Rally Championship (WRC):

- 1969 Lancia Fulvia, winner of the 1972 Daily Mirror Royal Automobile Club Rally, a predecessor of the WRC
- 1975 Lancia Stratos, winner of several races in the late 1970s and restored in 2011
- 1979 Fiat 131, was on the cover of Road & Track, May issue 1980
- 1980 Lancia Beta Montecarlo GR5, ran in Daytona 24 Hours in 1981 and dropped a valve on hour 14
- 1983 Lancia 037 Evo 2 chassis #11 of 20 Evolution 2s. Took part in nearly two dozen rally races, earning several top-three finishes, including first place in a 1985 Coppa Italia race
- 1983 Lancia LC2 chassis #001 of 7, raced at Monza and Le Mans in the 1983 and ‘84 seasons, and three races at Fuji in 1985
- 1985 Lancia Delta S4, used as a test car for all the races that the Delta S4 was in on the World Rally Championship
- 1988 Lancia Delta Integrale that won the 1988 Portugal Rally and the 1988 Olympus/USA race

His Lancia collection has been displayed at the 2015 Concours d’Elegance on Amelia Island, Florida. Campion's complete car collection also includes Ferraris, Alfa Romeos and Porsches.

== Philanthropy ==
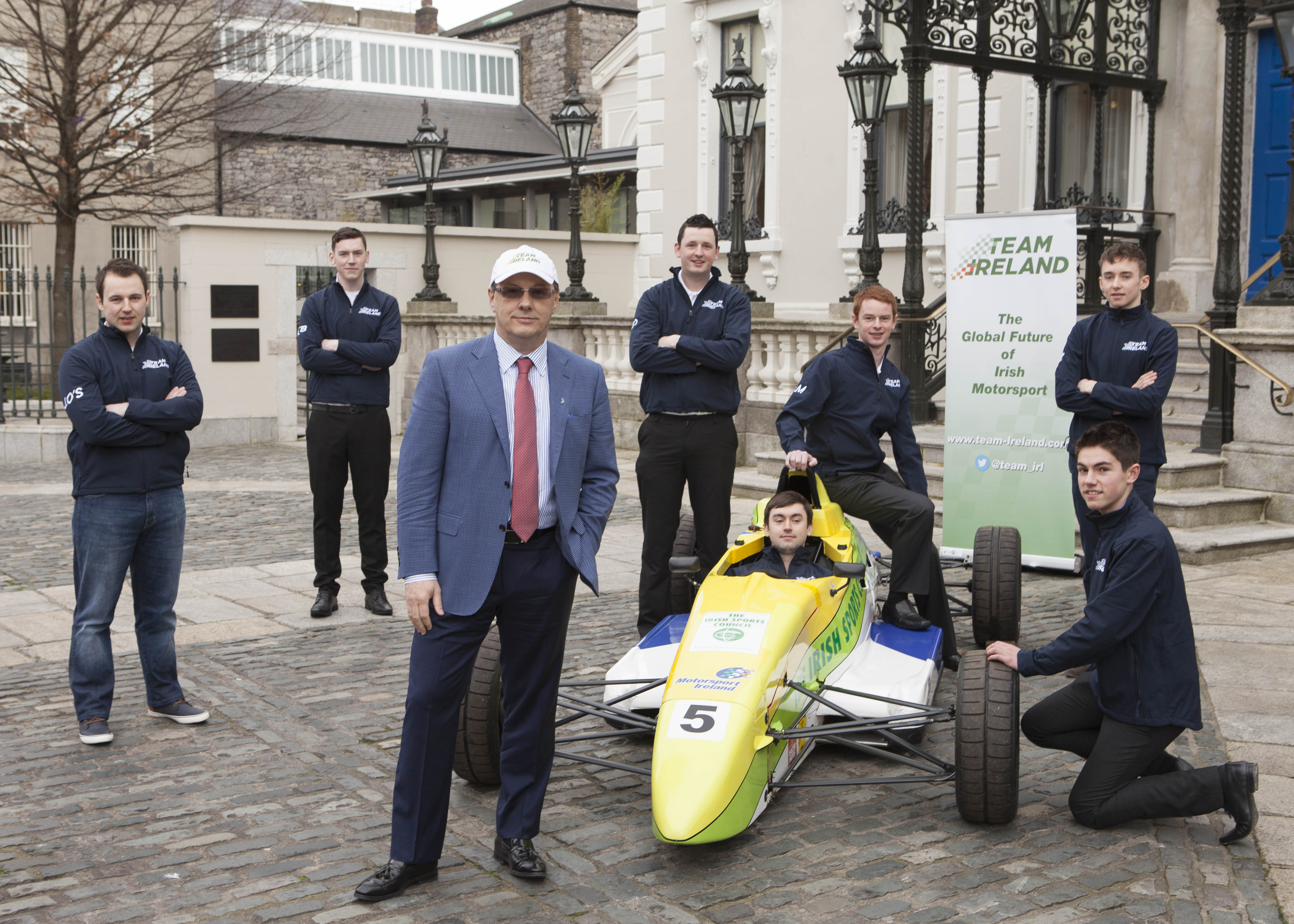
Inaugural Participants on Team Ireland Photo: Peter Houlihan

Campion helped to launch Team Ireland along with the Lord Mayor of Dublin and the President of Motorsport Ireland. The Team Ireland Foundation is a national program designed to support young drivers in the sports of rallying, racing and karting. Campion was involved with the University of North Florida’s Osprey SAE Student Race Team. The UNF Osprey Student Racing team received financial support and mentorship from Campion in 2015 and 2016. A partner of the Just a Bunch of Roadies (JABOR) global humanitarian group, Campion's work included donating fuel, plus trucks and personnel to relief efforts in Haiti following the earthquake in 2010. In addition to his other works, Campion served as a board member to The Catholic University of America, providing students development support.

== Death ==
Campion died from leukemia on October 2, 2020, aged 57.

== Awards and recognition ==
- 2017 Honorary BS in Mechanical Engineering from University of North Florida
- 2016 Ellis Island Medal of Honor Recipient
- Jacksonville Business Journal 2014 Ultimate CEO
- Performance Magazine Awards : ShowPower Generators 1996, 1997 & 1998
- Jacksonville Business Journal Innovation of the Year 2014
- MEED Quality Awards 2014 - Oman Power & Water Project of the Year
- Asian Power's Fast-Track Power Plant of the Year – 2014
- Middle East Electricity's Power Plant of the Year Finalist

== Patents ==
- Scalable Portable Modular Power Plant, US 8,816,518 B2
- Scalable Portable Modular Power Plant, US 8,872,366 B2
