= 2022 in Ireland =

- Centuries: 19th; 20th; 21st
- Decades: 2000s; 2010s; 2020s
- See also: 2022 in Northern Ireland; Other events of 2022; List of years in Ireland

Events during the year 2022 in Ireland.

== Incumbents ==
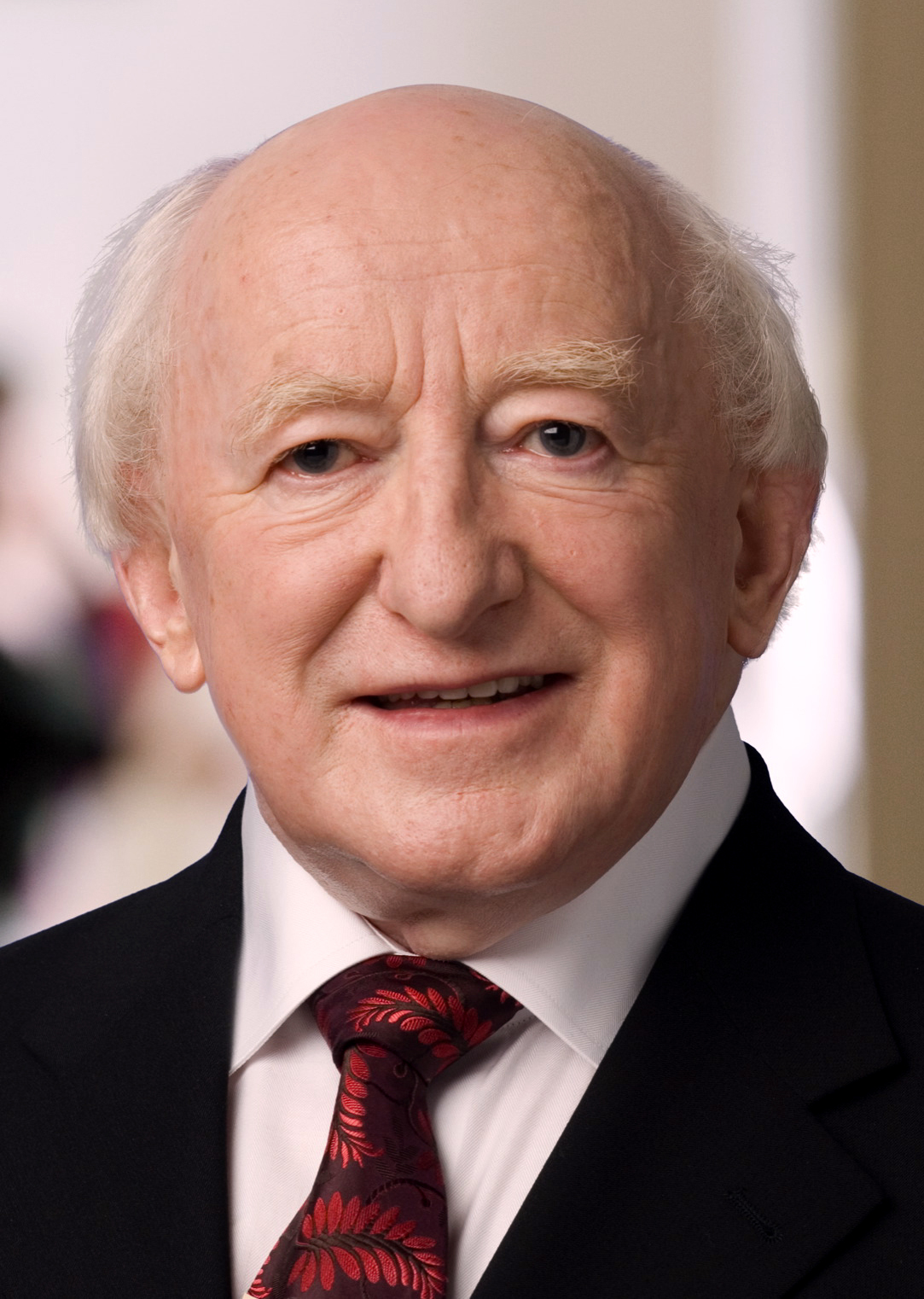
President Michael D. Higgins

- President: Michael D. Higgins
- Taoiseach:
  - Micheál Martin (FF) (until 17 December 2022)
  - Leo Varadkar (FG) (from 17 December 2022)
- Tánaiste:
  - Leo Varadkar (FG) (until 17 December 2022)
  - Micheál Martin (FF) (from 17 December 2022)
- Minister for Finance:
  - Paschal Donohoe (FG) (until 17 December 2022)
  - Michael McGrath (FF) (from 17 December 2022)
- Chief Justice: Donal O'Donnell
- Dáil: 33rd
- Seanad: 26th

== Events ==
=== Continuing events ===
- Irish anti-immigration protests (2022–present)

=== January ===
- 1 January – 23,281 cases of COVID-19 were recorded, as health officials warned that the true number of cases was likely to be higher, due to increased pressure on the PCR testing system.
- 4 January – Minister for Education Norma Foley confirmed that schools would reopen as planned on 6 January, despite rising COVID-19 cases.
- 6 January
  - The culture minister, Catherine Martin, began a consultation programme inviting opinions concerning the creation of a basic income plan for artists.
  - On the 430th anniversary of the 1592 escape of Art O'Neill and Red Hugh O'Donnell from Dublin Castle, two men completed a period-authentic reenactment of the journey from the castle to Glenmalure in County Wicklow, wearing the clothing of the period.
- 7 January – The body of Shane O'Connor, 17, son of singer Sinéad O'Connor and musician Donal Lunny, was found near Bray after being reported missing by the Garda Síochána (police) the previous day. His mother announced he had taken his own life, following two suicide attempts a week before.
- 9 January – A 49-year-old father-of-two was shot dead in Ballyfermot, Dublin.
- 10 January – The total number of confirmed COVID-19 cases in Ireland reached 1,000,000.
- 12 January – A 23-year-old primary school teacher, Ashling Murphy, was murdered beside the canal in Tullamore.
- 15 January – A National Lottery jackpot building since June 2021 and worth a record €19 million was won by a ticket sold in Castlebar.
- 18 January – Ashling Murphy's funeral took place and 31-year-old Jozef Puška was arrested on suspicion of her murder. (Puška would be sentenced to life imprisonment in November 2023).
- 19 January – The Government agreed a plan to give frontline healthcare workers a once-off €1,000 tax-free payment for their work during the COVID-19 pandemic and also agreed on an extra public holiday on 18 March in remembrance of people who died due to COVID-19.
- 21 January – Taoiseach Micheál Martin announced the easing of almost all COVID-19 restrictions from 6 am on 22 January, with the requirements of vaccine certificates and social distancing to end, restrictions on household visits and capacity limits for indoor and outdoor events to end, nightclubs to reopen and pubs and restaurants to resume normal trading times, while rules on isolation and the wearing of masks would remain.
- 22 January – Anthony Casserly was sentenced to nine years in prison for his involvement in the murder of Wayne Whelan in 2019.
- 25 January
  - The Taoiseach said Ireland was advising against non-essential travel to Ukraine, describing a planned Russian military exercise off the Irish coast in February as unwelcome.
  - Fishermen in the south and west of Ireland announced that they would hold peaceful protests to disrupt Russian naval exercises in February, set to take place within traditional Irish fishing areas.
- 29 January
  - Minister for Foreign Affairs Simon Coveney announced that controversial military exercises by the Russian Navy that were due to take place off the Irish coast had been relocated outside of Ireland's Exclusive Economic Zone.
  - The Novavax vaccine was approved for use as Ireland's fifth COVID-19 vaccine.
- 31 January – Chapters Bookstore in Parnell Street, Dublin, Ireland's largest independent bookshop, closed after trading for 40 years. following the announcement of its plan to do so the previous October.

=== February ===
- 1 February – The Minister for Education confirmed that the 2022 Leaving Certificate would be held with no accredited grades, while the Junior Cycle exam would be held for the first time since 2019.
- 4 February – RTÉ selected Brooke Scullion to represent Ireland in the Eurovision Song Contest in Turin, Italy in May with the song "That's Rich".
- 7 February – The FAI confirmed that it would be part of a joint bid with the football associations of Northern Ireland, England, Scotland and Wales to host UEFA Euro 2028.
- 8 February – The Government announced an €8 billion retrofit scheme, which aimed to bring half a million homes up to a B2 energy rating by 2030.
- 10 February – The Government agreed a €505 million package of measures to combat the rise in the cost of living, with an increase in the energy rebate to €200 including VAT, a 20% cut to public transport fares and recipients of the fuel allowance to receive an extra €125.
- 12 February – The Department of Foreign Affairs urged Irish citizens to leave Ukraine "immediately by commercial means".
- 18 February – Up to 80,000 homes and businesses were without power nationally, as Storm Eunice battered Ireland, with the most extensive damage in west Cork and Kerry. A 59-year-old council worker was killed in County Wexford by a falling tree while out clearing debris.
- 21 February – Over 29,000 homes and businesses were without power, as Storm Franklin battered the country overnight.
- 22 February
  - The Government agreed to end almost all remaining COVID-19 restrictions from 28 February, with mask wearing in schools, indoor retail settings and on public transport to be voluntary, restrictions in schools to end and testing to be scaled back.
  - The accidental killing of a trespasser by farmer/barrister Diarmuid Rossa Phelan on a rural farm lane near Tallaght resulted in a lengthy and highly publicised court case
- 24 February – The taoiseach condemned Russia's attack on Ukraine as "an outrageous and moral breach of the most fundamental principles of international law."
- 28 February
  - The majority of COVID-19 restrictions were removed, including the mandatory wearing of masks in retail settings and on public transport and social distancing in schools.
  - A Garda in his early 30s was being treated in hospital after a serious assault in County Cavan, during which a gun was pointed at him and was badly beaten and doused in petrol.

=== March ===
- 2 March – Alan Kelly announced his resignation as leader of the Labour Party, citing a lack of confidence in his leadership from party colleagues as the reason. He announced he would stay on as leader until a replacement was appointed, and would remain as a TD for Tipperary.
- 3 March – The Taoiseach launched this year's national population census, Census 2022, planned to take place on Sunday, 3 April.
- 4 March – President Michael D. Higgins and his wife Sabina tested positive for COVID-19.
- 5 March
  - Minister for Health Stephen Donnelly announced that the requirement for vaccination certificates and passenger locator forms for those arriving into Ireland would end from midnight, to make it easier for Ukrainian refugees to enter the country.
  - A man in his 30s was arrested following an acid attack on three men in Cork.
- 7 March – A man was arrested after driving a truck through the gates of the Russian Embassy in Dublin, in an apparent protest at Russia's invasion of Ukraine.
- 8 March
  - A convoy of 25 trucks carrying 500 tonnes of aid left Dublin Port on a long journey to the border of Ukraine.
  - 49-year-old Desmond Wisley was charged with causing criminal damage to the gates of the Russian embassy in Dublin on 7 March.
- 9 March
  - The Government announced a €320 million plan to cut the excise duty on petrol and diesel, with a cut of 20 cent per litre on petrol and 15 cent per litre of diesel.
  - Three men were arrested in connection with the aggravated burglary at the home of 73-year-old Tom Niland in Skreen, County Sligo, on 18 January.
- 11 March – Two people died, and a third person was injured, in a road crash in County Roscommon.
- 15 March – President Michael D. Higgins and Taoiseach Micheál Martin paid tribute to Irish citizen and Fox News cameraman Pierre Zakrzewski, after he was killed outside Kyiv in Ukraine.
- 17 March
  - Celebrations took place across the country to mark St Patrick's Day, following a two-year absence due to COVID-19, with around 400,000 people attending festivities in Dublin.
  - A poem written by Bono about Saint Patrick and the 2022 Russian invasion of Ukraine was recited by Nancy Pelosi at a White House event for Saint Patrick's Day. The poem was widely derided by the Irish public as "cringeworthy".
  - Taoiseach Micheál Martin tested positive for COVID-19 while in Washington for St Patrick's Day celebrations.
- 18 March – Rachael Blackmore became the first woman to win the Cheltenham Gold Cup.
- 20 March
  - Gardaí began a murder investigation after a 36-year-old mother of five was shot dead in Finglas, Dublin.
  - Events were held across the country to mark a national day of remembrance and reflection in honour of the more than 6,600 people who died from COVID-19.
- 22 March – The World Health Organization said Ireland was among some countries that eased COVID-19 restrictions too "brutally" and were now seeing a spike in cases as a result.
- 23 March – 27-year-old Derek Boyd was charged in connection with the fatal shooting of his sister Sandra Boyd in Finglas on 20 March.
- 24 March – Ivana Bacik became the new leader of the Labour Party following the resignation of Alan Kelly earlier in the month.
- 25 March
  - Tánaiste Leo Varadkar cancelled a number of engagements in Cork and began self-isolating after testing positive for COVID-19.
  - Minister for Foreign Affairs Simon Coveney was evacuated due to a security alert at a venue in Belfast where he had been giving a speech after an armed hijacking in the area.
  - Dr Tony Holohan announced that he would step down as Chief Medical Officer on 1 July, following his appointment as Professor of Public Health Strategy and Leadership at Trinity College Dublin.
- 26 March – Gardaí began an investigation after a 27-year-old man died and a 75-year-old man was seriously injured following a double stabbing in Cork. A 42-year-old man was arrested.
- 28 March – 42-year-old John Murphy was charged with the murder of his brother Shane (27) and the attempted murder of his father Weeshie (75) after a double stabbing in Cork on 26 March.
- 29 March
  - Minister for Health Stephen Donnelly said there were no plans for restrictions to be re-introduced, despite the number of COVID-19 cases likely to be "hundreds of thousands" per week, while he said the BA.2 variant now accounted for about 95% of cases in Ireland.
  - Minister for Education Norma Foley announced a major overhaul of the Leaving Certificate which aimed at reducing stress, with new subjects added, students starting fifth year in September 2023 to sit paper one in English and Irish and written exams to be worth no more than 60% of a student's final marks.
- 30 March – A 16-year-old boy went on trial at the Central Criminal Court, charged with the murder of a 49-year-old Mongolian woman on her way home from work in Dublin city centre on 29 January 2021.
- 31 March – Disability campaigner Tom Clonan wins the bye-election for the Seanad vacancy caused by Ivana Bacik's move to the Dáil in July 2021.

=== April ===
- 1 April – Atlantic Technological University, comprising the three institutes of technology in the northern and western regions – Letterkenny IT, Galway-Mayo IT and Sligo IT – formally came into operation, under its president Dr. Orla Flynn.
- 2 April – A man in his 20s died and three other people were injured in a single-vehicle road crash in County Tipperary.
- 3 April
  - The national population was counted during Census 2022.
  - Gardaí began a murder investigation after a 29-year-old man was shot dead in Finglas, Dublin.
- 4 April - The HSE announced that its Chief Operations Officer - Anne O'Connor - would be leaving the organisation in June to become managing director of VHI Health and Wellbeing.
- 6 April
  - The president of Ukraine Volodymyr Zelenskyy addressed both houses of the Oireachtas by video link, urging Ireland to show "more leadership" on the war.
  - The National Immunisation Advisory Committee (NIAC) recommended a fourth COVID-19 vaccine dose for everyone aged 65 and older, and for those aged 12 and older who are immunocompromised.
  - The jury in the case of a 16-year-old boy accused of murdering 49-year-old Uransetseg Tserendorj who was stabbed in the neck on her way home from work last year failed to agree on a verdict.
  - Kinder products were recalled due to a link with an outbreak of Salmonella after some of the brand's chocolate eggs were recalled at the weekend.
- 8 April – Minister for Health Stephen Donnelly announced the establishment of a new COVID-19 advisory group, replacing the National Public Health Emergency Team.
- 9 April – Chief Medical Officer Tony Holohan announced that he would retire on 1 July and would not take up a planned academic position at Trinity College Dublin, following several days of controversy.
- 11 April
  - A number of hauliers and truckers protesting over spiralling fuel costs were fined for obstructing roads in the docklands area of Dublin, while some left the area mid-morning following a vote.
  - Tánaiste Leo Varadkar condemned a suspected homophobic attack after a 23-year-old man was left seriously injured with a fractured eye socket, a dislocated ankle and other injuries, following an incident in Dublin.
- 12 April
  - The US government imposed sanctions on the three most senior members of the Kinahan Organised Crime Group and offered rewards of up to $5 million for information leading to their arrests or the financial disruption of the gang.
  - Gardaí began an investigation after the body of a man in his late 30s, named locally as Aidan Moffitt, was found in Sligo.
- 13 April
  - The Minister for Foreign Affairs and Minister for Defence Simon Coveney and Ireland's ambassador to Ukraine Thérèse Healy visited Ukraine where Coveney met his counterparts, Ukraine foreign minister Dmytro Kuleba and defence minister Oleksii Reznikov, in Kyiv and visited the site of the Bucha massacre the following day. Coveney travelled via Poland and was the first foreign minister on the UN Security Council to visit Ukraine since the Russian invasion began in February. He was also accompanied by a political adviser and a protection team.
  - A second man, 58-year-old Michael Snee, was murdered in Sligo, as two separate murder investigations were underway with Gardaí probing links to a serial killer. A 22-year-old man was arrested.
- 14 April – A 22-year-old man, Yousef Palani, was charged with the murders of Aidan Moffitt and Michael Snee in Sligo, and was also charged with assault causing serious harm, arising out of an incident on Saturday 9 April.
- 16 April
  - A 48-year-old man died following a serious assault in Limerick.
  - Parents were urgently reminded not to let their children eat any Kinder eggs that they may receive on Easter Sunday due to a significant risk of Salmonella infection.
- 17 April
  - President Michael D. Higgins and Taoiseach Micheál Martin attended a ceremony held outside the GPO in Dublin to commemorate the 1916 Rising, the first public event to mark the uprising since the COVID-19 pandemic.
  - Gardaí in Dublin arrested a man in his 30s in connection with a serious assault that left a male victim in his 20s in critical condition in hospital.
  - A man in his 20s was serious injured after he was struck by a car in Navan, County Meath.
  - Five people were hospitalised after being injured in a two-car collision in County Waterford.
- 19 April – Kate Moran, a camogie player in her early 20s, died following an incident during a senior league game in Ardrahan, County Galway.
- 20 April
  - Businessman and former billionaire Seán Quinn said his home was searched by Gardaí, but that he did not know why.
  - A prison officer at Mountjoy Prison was hospitalised after she was attacked and cut with a homemade knife during a row among ten prisoners.
- 21 April – A 39-year-old man died following a serious assault in Sligo, but Gardaí believed the death was not linked in any way to the killings of Aidan Moffitt and Michael Snee.
- 23 April
  - Gardaí began an investigation after two men were seriously injured in a suspected arson attack at a house in Tallaght, Dublin in the early hours of the morning.
  - A woman in her 50s died after she got into difficulty while swimming off a beach in County Wicklow.
  - The first full-capacity concert at Croke Park since the COVID-19 pandemic took place, with Ed Sheeran kicking off his world tour singing for over 80,000 fans.
- 27 April
  - The World Health Organization said there would be surges in COVID-19 cases every three months, with Ireland expected to see another surge in four to six weeks.
  - Five members of a prolific criminal gang suspected of a burglary crime-wave across Leinster were arrested following a high-speed chase.
  - It was announced that NUI Galway would be renamed "Ollscoil na Gaillimhe – University of Galway" in the summer, amid confusion over its proper title.
- 29 April – 30-year-old Gavin Murphy was sentenced to life in prison for murdering his partner, 24-year-old Jennifer Poole, at her home in Dublin on 17 April 2021.

=== May ===
- 1 May
  - Katie Taylor remained the female boxing lightweight world champion after defeating Amanda Serrano at Madison Square Garden, New York City.
  - A carbon tax increase on home heating fuels took effect, with the price of gas in every home likely to rise by €1.40 per month and home heating oil by €1.50.
- 3 May
  - Taoiseach Micheál Martin described a mock-up on Russian state television of a nuclear attack destroying Ireland and Britain as "very sinister, intimidatory-type tactics by the Russian Federation".
- 7 May
  - Henry O'Donnell from County Donegal became the first person to swim around Ireland when he reached his point of departure at Carrickfinn Beach in the county. The circumnavigation was 1,569 kilometres long.
  - Thousands of people took part in this year's Darkness into Light event, the first time since 2019 that in-person walks took place to mark the event due to COVID-19.
- 9 May – Public transport fares were reduced nationally for the first time since 1947 as part of the Government's plans to help ease the cost of living.
- 10 May
  - The Department of Health announced that Deputy Chief Medical Officer Ronan Glynn would resign at the end of the month to take up a role with a consultancy firm.
- 12 May – Singer Brooke Scullion failed to qualify for the Eurovision Song Contest Grand Final 2022.
- 14 May – Thousands attended a protest rally outside Dáil Éireann, seeking that a new National Maternity Hospital be secular and should be built on state land.
- 17 May - The Government approved plans to proceed with locating a new National Maternity Hospital at St. Vincent's University Hospital, despite concerns of TDs about the term 'clinically appropriate' in the hospital's constitution, as well as ownership of the land on which it will be built, and what this means for its independence.
- 18 May – Hundreds of medical scientists took part in industrial action over pay and retention issues after negotiations with the HSE and Department of Health failed to bring about a resolution, causing significant disruption and service delays in hospitals.
- 28 May – The first case of the monkeypox virus was confirmed in the east of the country.
- 29 May – Phase 3 of the BusConnects transport infrastructure programme was launched in Dublin.
- 30 May – A second case of monkeypox was confirmed in Ireland.

=== June ===
- 1 June
  - Two further cases of monkeypox were confirmed, totalling four.
  - The Environmental Protection Agency published a report confirming that Ireland was "way off course" to meet targets for reductions in greenhouse gas emissions.
- 3 June – Two men aged in their 50s and 60s were killed in a crash on the M50 that led to the northbound route of the motorway being closed for several hours.
- 4 June – A 44-year-old woman died and her two children were hospitalised after the car in which they were travelling entered the River Lee in Cork city.
- 5 June – Gardaí and the Road Safety Authority urged the public to exercise caution on the roads for the remainder of the June bank holiday weekend following a number of fatal incidents in recent days.
- 8 June – More than 131,000 students began their Leaving and Junior Certificate examinations, marking the first full return to traditional written June exams in two years due to the COVID-19 pandemic.
- 9 June – Gardaí seized €156,000 worth of cannabis plants being grown in a home in Moate, County Westmeath. A man was arrested and detained.
- 14 June
  - The Government announced that the minimum wage (€10.50 per hour in 2022) would be replaced with a new "living wage" set at 60% of the median wage in any year (which would be €12.17 an hour in 2022). The living wage would be phased in between 2023 and 2026.
  - President Michael D. Higgins described housing in Ireland as "our great, great failure", saying "It isn't a crisis anymore - it is a disaster."
- 18 June – A number of protests took place across the country over the cost of living.
- 20 June
  - Latest figures showed that there were 606 patients in hospital with COVID-19, an increase of 153 from the previous week. HSE Chief Clinical Officer Dr Colm Henry said he was "very concerned", while a virologist at UCD said it was too late to reintroduce mandatory mask wearing, adding that the latest wave of infection had been "completely predictable".
  - Gardaí began an investigation after the discovery of two bodies in a house in south Tipperary.
- 21 June – Gardaí began an investigation after a man's body was discovered on the grounds of RTÉ in Dublin.
- 23 June
  - Preliminary results of Census 2022 released by the CSO showed that Ireland's population increased by 7.6% in the six years between 2016 and 2022, standing at 5,123,536 people – the first time the population had been over five million since 1851.
  - Allied Irish Banks and its subsidiary, the EBS building society, are hit with record fines totalling €96.7m for their part in the tracker mortgage scandal, where mortgage holders were illegally transferred from tracker mortgages that followed European Central Bank interest rates onto variable rates that benefited the lenders, and which resulted in some mortgage holders losing their family homes.
- 26 June – The GAA was set to launch a disciplinary investigation following a brawl between players from both sides in the All-Ireland SFC quarter-final between penalty winners Galway and losers Armagh at the end of normal time, which saw Galway forward Damien Comer suffer an apparent eye-gouge.
- 27 June – Paul Reid announced that he would be stepping down from his position as Director-General of the Health Service Executive at the end of the year "to spend time with his family".
- 28 June
  - It was reported that early work was under way on new legislation which would allow the Government to make mask-wearing mandatory again in certain settings as a precautionary measure in the event of the COVID-19 situation worsening in the winter.
  - The Government agreed to a request from Minister for Transport Eamon Ryan for the Irish Army to be on standby to help with security at Dublin Airport.
  - The Government approved a new €363 million strategy to tackle domestic, sexual and gender-based violence.
- 29 June – The Garda Síochána announced a full review by the Cold Case Unit into the 1996 murder of Sophie Toscan du Plantier.
- 30 June – The Birth Information and Tracing Bill 2022 is signed into law, which will allow adopted people to access their birth and early life information.

=== July ===
- 1 July – Armagh footballer Tiernan Kelly received a 24-week ban and three others received one-match penalties following an incident that occurred in the 2022 All-Ireland quarter-final between Armagh and Galway.
- 4 July – The Government agreed that the 2023 budget would be held on 27 September, two weeks earlier than planned.
- 5 July – Minister for Transport Eamon Ryan confirmed that planning permission for Dublin's MetroLink would be lodged in September, with an expectation that it could be in operation in the early 2030s at a cost of €9.5bn.
- 6 July
  - Taoiseach Micheál Martin travelled to Kyiv to meet Ukrainian President Volodymyr Zelenskyy as part of a visit to discuss how Ireland and the EU could support Ukraine.
  - The Director of Public Prosecutions decided that Tánaiste Leo Varadkar would not face prosecution following the investigation surrounding the disclosure of a confidential Government document to a friend in April 2019.
  - Former Minister for Education Joe McHugh resigned the Fine Gael whip after he voted against the Government's proposed mica redress legislation, leaving the Government without a majority.
- 12 July
  - The Government was to maintain the current television licence but said it would overhaul the system to ensure it was more equitable, relevant and sustainable.
  - The Government won a motion of confidence in the Dáil, with 85 votes in favour to 66 against.
- 13 July – Met Éireann issued a high temperature advisory for Ireland, with temperatures forecast to reach the high 20s Celsius, and possibly exceeding 30°.
- 15 July – Met Éireann issued a Status Yellow high temperature warning for Ireland, with "exceptionally" high temperatures possibly up to 32 °C forecast.
- 17 July
  - Defending hurling champions Limerick won the 2022 All-Ireland Senior Hurling Championship Final against Kilkenny.
  - Gardaí began an investigation after a 14-year-old boy was stabbed in Cork city.
- 18 July – A temperature of 33 °C was reported at the Phoenix Park in Dublin, the highest temperature ever recorded in Ireland in July and breaking the high temperature records for the 20th and 21st centuries.
- 19 July – Allied Irish Banks (AIB) announced it would turn 70 of its 170 branches into cashless outlets by October as a result of what it claimed was declining demand for these services. Under the plans, these branches would no longer provide cash or cheque services and ATMs would also be removed. The announcement was heavily criticised by bank customers, political representatives, and GAA clubs.
- 20 July – The Sick leave Act 2022 became law. The scheme is being phased in over a four-year period. The scheme entitles employees to be paid for limited periods of sick leave, for days on which they would ordinarily work but are incapable of doing so due to illness or injury.
- 21 July – Taoiseach Micheál Martin said the AIB bank should "reconsider and reflect on" its decision to remove cash facilities at 70 branches around the country.
- 22 July
  - Allied Irish Bank reversed its decision to end cash services at 70 branches around the country following a backlash to the move from business groups, consumers, farming and rural organisations and politicians.
  - Lisa Smith was sentenced at the Special Criminal Court to 15 months in prison following her conviction on 30 May of membership of the Daesh Sunni terrorist group.
- 24 July – Munster champions Kerry won the 2022 All-Ireland Senior Football Championship Final against Connacht champions Galway.

=== August ===
- 3 August – Gardaí began a murder investigation after a 34-year-old man who suffered serious head injuries after an assault by four inmates in his Mountjoy Prison cell died in hospital.
- 5 August – Gardaí believed that the Kinahan Organised Crime Group was involved in a smuggling operation that saw the seizure of cocaine worth €8.4 million, which was flown into County Longford on a private plane.
- 9 August – Met Éireann issued a Status Yellow high-temperature warning for Leinster and Munster, warning of "very warm or hot on Thursday 11, Friday 12 and Saturday 13 August with maximum temperatures of 27 to 29 degrees".
- 11 August – Met Éireann extended its high-temperature warning nationwide.
- 12 August
  - A temperature of 31.7 °C was reported at Oak Park, County Carlow, breaking the Irish temperature record for August.
  - A woman in her 20s died and a man in his 30s was arrested following an assault at a house outside Athboy in County Meath.
- 13 August – A man died in hospital from injuries following an assault at a party in Athlone. Two men were arrested.
- 17 August – Tánaiste Leo Varadkar said people should feel safe on public transport but a decision on a dedicated transport police unit was a matter for the Garda Commissioner and not the Government, following a call from the National Bus and Rail Workers Union for such a move after a number of recent assaults on staff and passengers, including one homophobic assault of a 26-year-old man on a Dublin Bus on 14 August.
- 19–23 August - The Rose of Tralee Festival was held for the first time since 2019, and was won by Rachel Duffy, the Westmeath Rose.
- 22 August – A man died in hospital from head injuries from an assault by eight men outside a pub in Monasterevin.
- 23 August – A senior fellow at the Irish Council for Civil Liberties joined a class action lawsuit in US state of California against Oracle Corporation for allegedly operating a "surveillance machine" tracking five billion people.
- 24 August – Robert Troy resigned from his role as Minister of State for Trade Promotion following revelations about his failure to declare property interests.

=== September ===
- 2 September – More than 61,000 Leaving Certificate students received their results, which were artificially boosted in order to comply with a commitment made by Minister for Education Norma Foley earlier this year.
- 3 September
  - A male teenager was critically injured after a serious assault at a nightclub in Clondalkin, Dublin.
  - The HSE issued a drug warning to Electric Picnic festivalgoers after "high strength" MDMA with two times the average dose was found.
- 4 September
  - Three siblings – Lisa Cash, an 18-year-old girl and twins, and her twin siblings Christy Cawley and Chelsea Cawley aged eight – were stabbed to death at a house in Tallaght, Dublin. A man known to the victims aged in his early 20s, was arrested at the scene after being shot with non-lethal rounds by Gardaí.
  - There were widespread expressions of sympathy and shock at the tragic death of 13-year-old Jack de Bromhead, son of national hunt horse trainer Henry de Bromhead who died in a horse racing accident at Glenbeigh races in County Kerry.
- 5 September – 24-year-old Andy Cash was charged with the murders of his three siblings in Tallaght, Dublin.
- 6 September – The Irish government fined Meta Platforms US$402 million over privacy violations.
- 9 September – Two children died and a woman was seriously injured following a car fire in County Westmeath.
- 13 September – Gardaí launched a murder investigation after the body of a 28-year-old man, named Tony Dempsey, was found at a flat managed by the Peter McVerry Trust in Dublin's north inner city.
- 14 September – Gardaí believed 28-year-old Tony Dempsey was killed in a drug-related incident by someone he knew and that his body was left to decompose on the floor for over a week after he suffered severe head injuries following a violent assault.
- 17 September – Up to 3,000 people attended a cost of living protest in Cork city, warning that they face a stark choice of deciding between heating and eating this winter.
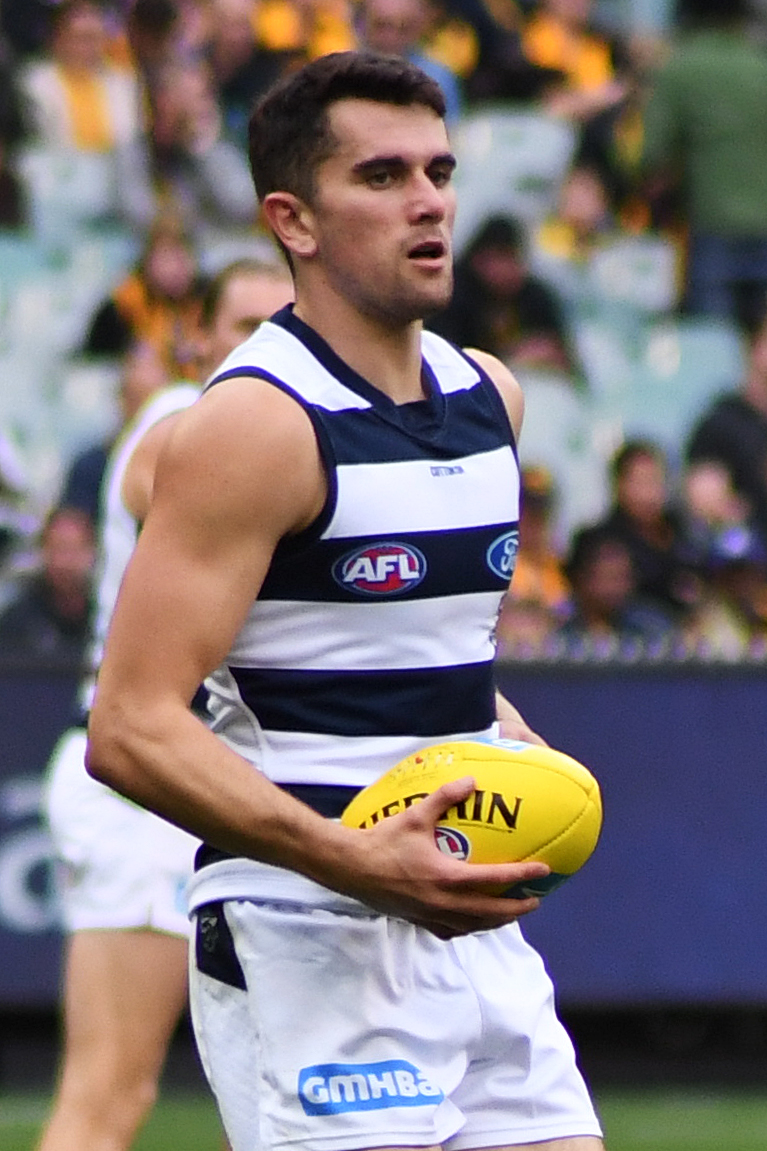
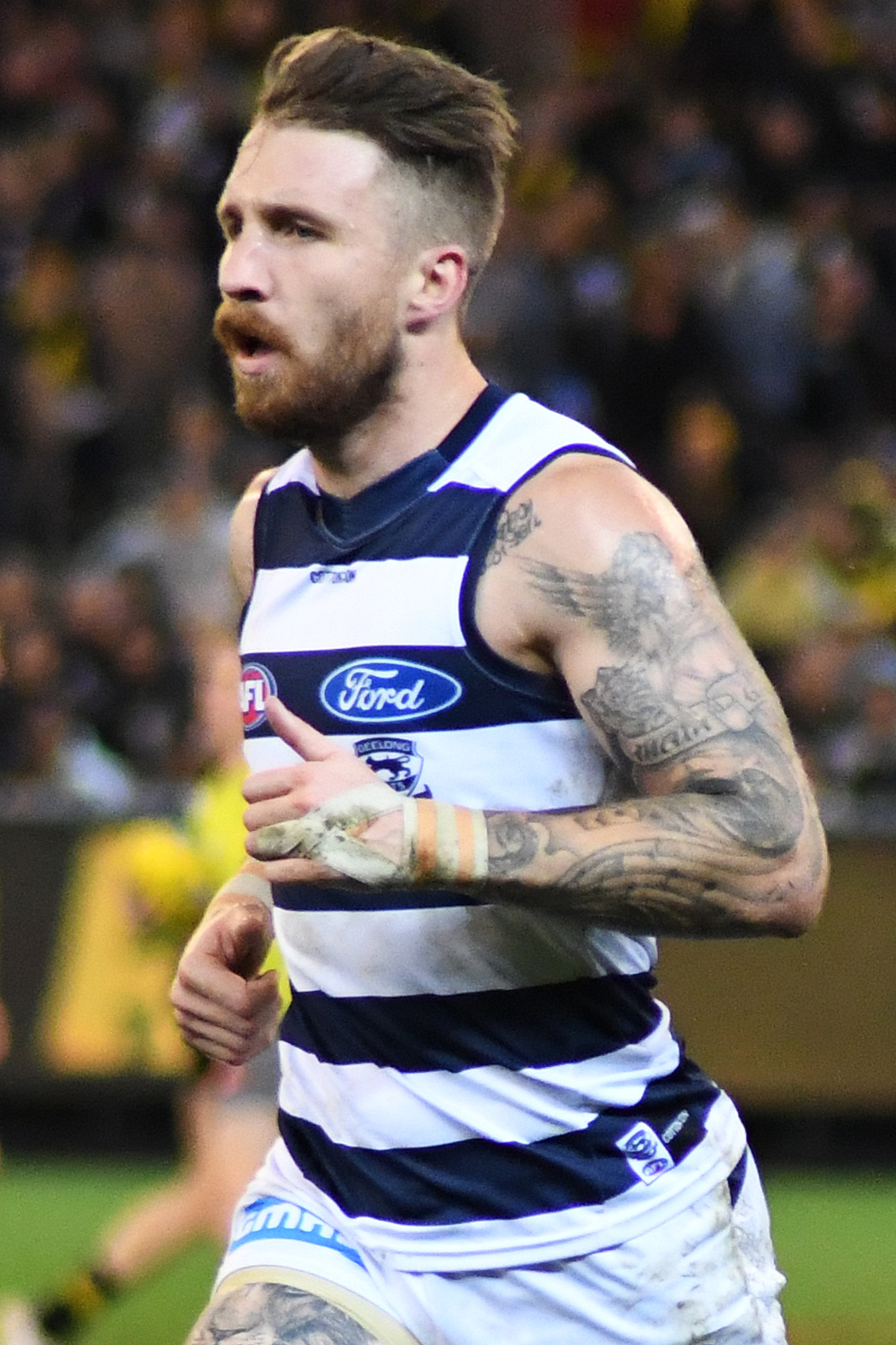
On 24 September, Mark O'Connor (left) and Zach Tuohy (right), playing for the Geelong Football Club, became only the second and third Irish players to win an AFL title.
- 18 September
  - A major rescue operation was under way after a man in his 40s got trapped in a sea cave in County Mayo.
  - A male pedestrian aged in his 50s died after being struck by a Luas tram in Dublin.
  - President Michael D. Higgins and Taoiseach Micheál Martin paid their respects to Britain's Queen Elizabeth II at her lying in state in Westminster Hall in London.
- 19 September – President Michael D. Higgins and Taoiseach Micheál Martin were among 500 presidents, prime ministers, foreign royal family members and dignitaries who attended the state funeral of Queen Elizabeth II.
- 20 September
  - The 2022 National Ploughing Championships returned as normal for the first time since 2019 due to the COVID-19 pandemic.
  - An incident in which two Gardaí in a patrol car were rammed by another vehicle in Cherry Orchard, Dublin was described as "disgraceful" and "concerning" by Garda Commissioner Drew Harris, while Minister for Justice Helen McEntee said it was "absolutely unacceptable".
- 21 September
  - 115,500 people attended day two of the National Ploughing Championships, the highest attendance ever recorded on a single day in the history of the event.
  - A plane carrying Taoiseach Micheál Martin returned to Dublin after a bird struck its engine over the Atlantic Ocean, causing him to miss a reception with world leaders including Joe Biden, the second time in six months that Martin missed meeting the U.S. president following his COVID-19 diagnosis while in Washington in March.
- 22 September – A 48-year-old woman was charged with the murder of her two children in a car fire in County Westmeath on 9 September.
- 24 September
  - 2022 AFL Grand Final: Zach Tuohy from Portlaoise and Mark O'Connor from Dingle became only the second and third Irish players to win an AFL title, following Tadhg Kennelly in 2005.
  - Taoiseach Micheál Martin addressed the United Nations General Assembly in New York.
- 27 September – Minister for Finance Paschal Donohoe and Minister for Public Expenditure and Reform Michael McGrath announced Budget 2023, with electricity credits for all households to total €600, a €12 increase to core social welfare payments, and the price of diesel and petrol to remain static.
- 29 September – It was announced that Tayto Park and zoo would be renamed Emerald Park from 1 January 2023.

=== October ===
- 3 October – Adopted people, those who were boarded out or subject to an illegal birth registration and their natural relatives can apply for their birth and early life information and access birth certificates from today.
- 5 October – A man in his 40s dies and his wife is seriously injured when they are stabbed at a family funeral in Tralee, County Kerry.
- 6 October – The Irish Dancing Commission, Ireland's governing body for Irish dancing, appoints a former judge to investigate claims of prominent dance schools and teachers fixing competitions.
- 7 October
  - An explosion destroys an Applegreen service station in Creeslough, County Donegal.
  - A 35-year-old man is charged with the murder of his older brother Thomas Dooley, after a stabbing at a Kerry funeral on 5 October.
  - 35-year-old Patrick Ballard is sentenced to life in prison for the murder of his partner in a public toilet in County Clare in January 2021.
- 8 October
  - Ten people are confirmed to have been killed by the Creeslough explosion.
  - Gardaí began an investigation after the bodies of a woman in her 40s and a baby boy were found at a house in west Dublin.
- 9 October – Tributes are paid to the ten people who died in the Creeslough explosion, after the names of the victims are released by Gardaí.
- 11 October – The Republic of Ireland women's football team qualified for the World Cup for the first time, following a 1–0 victory over Scotland.
- 12 October – President Higgins returned from Strasbourg to begin attending funerals at St Michael's Church, Creeslough.
- 13 October
  - Thousands of students on college campuses throughout the country participated in a national walkout in protest at the cost-of-living and accommodation crises.
  - UEFA opened an investigation after Republic of Ireland players sang a pro-IRA chant following their Women's World Cup play-off victory over Scotland.
- 16 October
  - Killing of David Byrne: The trial of Gerry "The Monk" Hutch, a prominent crime boss, in relation to the Hutch–Kinahan feud, began in Dublin.
  - Phase 4 of the BusConnects transport infrastructure programme was launched in Dublin. Originally planned to have launched in August 2022, the phase was delayed to October due to a lack of driver availability.
- 22 October
  - The Republic of Ireland women's national football team was drawn into Group B of the 2023 FIFA Women's World Cup alongside co-hosts Australia, Nigeria and Canada.
  - Meeting held in Tuam to reopen the Western Rail Corridor connecting Galway, County Mayo, Sligo, County Donegal onto Northern Ireland by train.
- 25 October – The Government agreed the outline of legislation that would allow pubs open from 10:30am to 12:30am, seven days a week, while nightclubs would not have to close until 6am.
- 26 October
  - An investigation was launched after the body of a man in his 60s was found in a house near Kinnegad, County Westmeath. Gardaí believed the man died in violent circumstances and identified a person of interest.
  - A 21-year-old man was jailed for 3 1/2 years for the manslaughter of a young fisherman in County Waterford in 2018.
  - EY announce that Paul Reid, former head of the HSE who stepped down earlier this month to spend time with his family, and who had used EY as consultants, may be involved in advisory work for some of its clients from next year.

=== November ===
- 4 November – Twitter began laying off members of its Irish workforce with some staff in the Dublin office receiving emails telling them that they were being made redundant after its offices temporarily closed, following a week of uncertainty about the company's future under new CEO Elon Musk.
- 5 November
  - The Irish rugby team recorded a 19–16 win over reigning Rugby world champions South Africa at the Aviva Stadium.
  - A teenage boy who was in Garda custody after being arrested on suspicion of theft at Galway Shopping Centre broke out of the official Garda van he was being held in.
  - Rhys McClenaghan claimed a gold medal in the 2022 World Artistic Gymnastics Championships and became a world champion on Pommel Horse.
- 9 November – The Government agreed that Tánaiste Leo Varadkar would take over the position of Taoiseach from Micheál Martin on Saturday 17 December and not 15 December as previously agreed in the Programme for Government.
- 11 November – A 16-year-old boy was found guilty of the murder of a 49-year-old woman, Urantsetseg Tserendorj, on her way home from work in Dublin city centre in January 2021.
- 14 November – CervicalCheck cancer scandal campaigner Vicky Phelan died at the age of 48.
- 15 November – Limerick to Foynes railway line reopening plans for 2025.
- 16 November – Russia banned entry to Taoiseach Micheál Martin, and more than 50 other top officials, in response to international sanctions over Ukraine.
- 18 November – Twitter temporarily closed its office in Dublin, as more staff chose to leave, sparking new concerns about the site's ability to stay online.
- 19 November – A 16-year-old girl with special needs who was seriously injured in a fatal road crash in County Kilkenny was a victim sitting in the car when it was stolen, resulting in the death of the thief. 37-year-old Dale Fogarty was known to gardaí and had alcohol and drugs addiction issues.
- 21 November – Four people were arrested after two gardaí, a man and a woman, were subjected to a "vicious assault" while responding to an incident in Ballyfermot in Dublin that was heavily condemned by the Taoiseach, Minister for Justice and Garda management and representatives.
- 22 November – The Government approved a ban on the sale of e-cigarettes to minors after proposals were brought to the Cabinet.
- 23 November – More than 67,000 students received the long-awaited results of their Junior Cycle exams, five months after they sat the tests.
- 29 November – A man in his 20s was arrested after a nine-year-old boy was seriously injured with his lip bitten off by a pit bull near his home in Enniscorthy, County Wexford.

=== December ===
- 1 December
  - 1 December – The President of the European Commission Ursula von der Leyen addressed both Houses of the Oireachtas as part of the 50th anniversary (1 January 1973) of Ireland joining the European Economic Community (now the European Union).
  - An investigation was launched after the bodies of two men were discovered at different locations in County Monaghan early in the morning. Gardaí believed there was a link between the two deaths.
- 7 December
  - The HSE wrote to schools and childcare providers advising them that children with fever, cough and sore throat should be kept home to combat a "significant increase in viral infections" and amid concerns about Group A Strep.
  - Motorists were being urged to take care as temperatures were forecast to plummet to −4 °C with Met Éireann issuing Status Yellow low temperature and ice warnings nationwide.
- 9 December – Freezing fog, severe ice and frost and wintry showers resulted in 143 flights cancelled at Dublin Airport, with −7 °C recorded in County Roscommon.
- 10 December – Further flights were cancelled at Dublin Airport as Met Éireann issued a Status Orange low temperature and ice warning for Ireland, with temperatures forecast to fall below −5 °C in many areas.
- 11 December
  - Two separate murder investigations were launched in County Meath after two men's bodies were found 30 km apart in County Meath. Gardaí were investigating whether a man in his 20s who died following a serious assault was killed at a different location before his remains were dumped on farmland in Kilbride. Meanwhile, a woman in her 30s was arrested in connection with the death of a man in his 40s who died in violent circumstances in Navan.
  - The National Emergency Coordination Group met to assess the weather with schools to remain open, as Met Éireann warned low temperatures would continue for another five days.
  - Singer Sophie Lennon represented Ireland in the Junior Eurovision Song Contest 2022 with the song "Solas", and finished in fourth place.
- 12 December – Ireland saw its coldest day in 12 years since 2010 across Met Éireann's network of 25 synoptic.
- 13 December – The National Biodiversity Data Centre in Waterford was restructured as a Company Limited by Guarantee (CLG), with a new board and governance structure.
- 15 December – Tributes were paid after 24-year-old Irish soldier Seán Rooney serving with the UN peacekeeping mission in Lebanon was killed and a second Irish soldier 22-year-old Shane Kearney was seriously injured in an attack on a vehicle carrying four personnel.
- 16 December – Numerous investigations began into what happened in Lebanon which could have led to the tragedy which left one Irish soldier dead and another critically injured.
- 17 December – Leo Varadkar was appointed as Taoiseach for a second time by President Michael D. Higgins and formed a new government, after Micheál Martin resigned as part of the 2020 coalition agreement between Fianna Fáil, Fine Gael and the Green Party.
- 19 December – The body of murdered peacekeeper Seán Rooney arrived back in Ireland from Lebanon where the family of the 24-year-old were reunited with his remains.
- 22 December – Mourners attending the funeral of Irish UN peacekeeper Private Seán Rooney in Dundalk were told he was a national hero and that his death had pierced the hearts of his family and the wider community.
- 29 December – A 19-year-old teenager was arrested after a 29-year-old man was left fighting for his life in hospital following a serious assault in County Cork.
- 30 December – 19-year-old Ricardo Hoey was charged with assault following the incident in County Cork which left a 29-year-old man in a critical condition.

== The Arts ==
- 11 February – First showing of Irish language film The Quiet Girl.
- 4 March – First showing of film An Irish Goodbye.
- 4 November – First showing of documentary The Peculiar Sensation of Being Pat Ingoldsby.

== Sport ==
=== Association football ===
International friendly matches

- 26 March – Ireland 2–2 Belgium
- 29 March – Ireland 1–0 Lithuania

Nations League

- 4 June – Armenia 1–0 Ireland
- 8 June – Ireland 0–1 Ukraine
- 11 June – Ireland 3–0 Scotland
- 14 June – Ukraine 1–1 Ireland
- 24 September – Scotland 2–1 Ireland
- 27 September – Ireland 3–2 Armenia
- 17 November – Ireland 1–2 Norway
- 20 November – Malta 0–1 Ireland

== Deaths ==
=== January ===
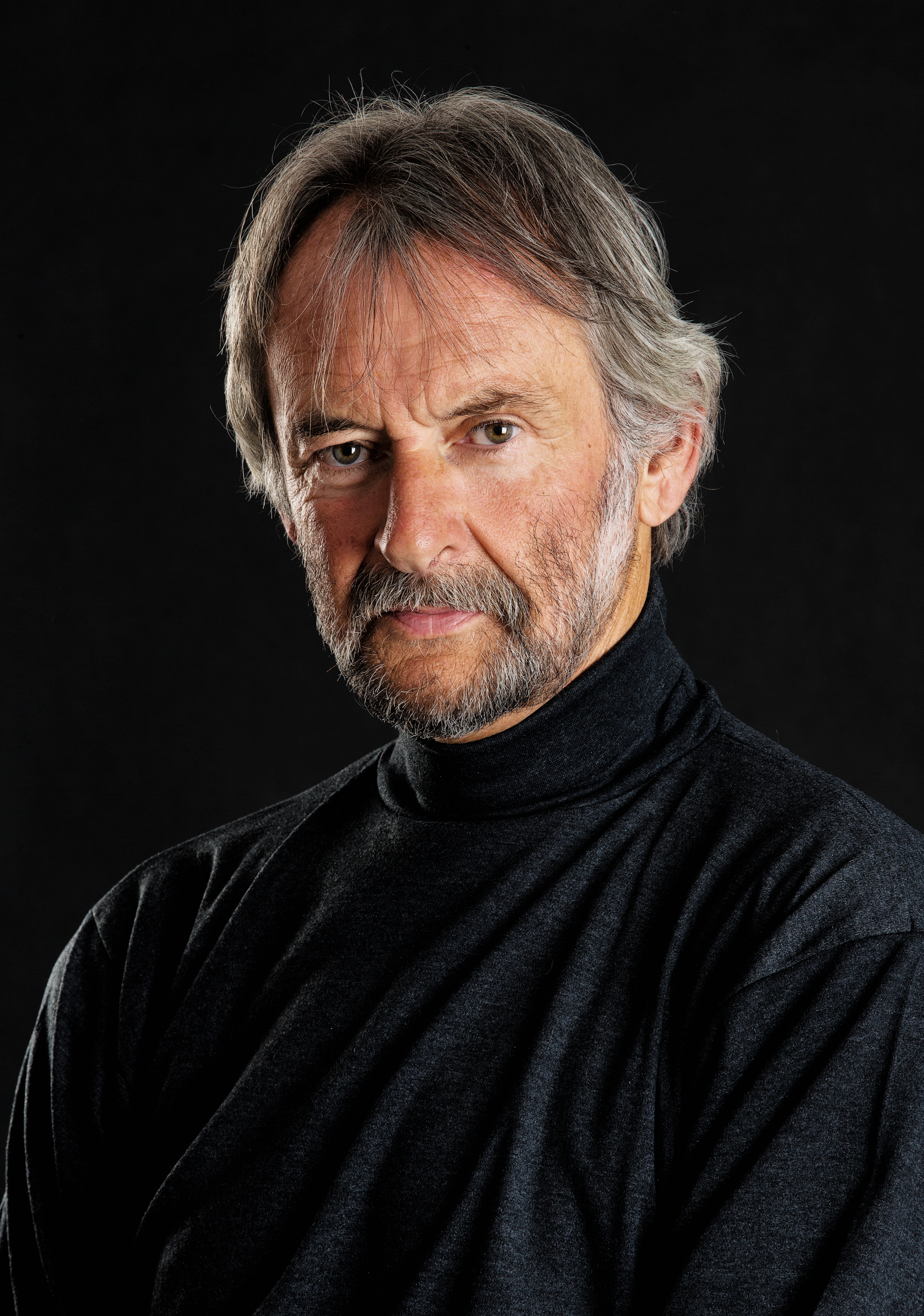
Colm Keane

- 3 January – Richard Sinnott, 74, academic and political commentator, long illness.
- 5 January – Jack Kissane, 92, Gaelic footballer (Galway senior team).
- 9 January – Michael Joe Cosgrave, 83, politician, TD (1977–1992 and 1997–2002).
- 10 January – Brian Hannon, 85, Church of Ireland prelate.
- 15 January – Jim Fahy, 75, journalist and broadcaster, short illness.
- 16 January – Kevin Flynn, 82, rugby union player (Wanderers, Leinster, national team).
- 21 January – Donal Hurley, 85, Gaelic footballer (St Finbarr's, Cork senior team).
- 22 January
  - Colm Keane, 70, author, broadcaster and journalist.
  - Jimmy Campbell, 84, fiddle player.

=== February ===
- 2 February – Noel Treacy, 70, politician, TD (1982–2011) and Minister of State (1987–1991, 1992–1994 and 1994–1997).
- 3 February – Tom Kiernan, 83, rugby union player (Cork Constitution, Munster, national team) and coach (national team).
- 4 February – Colin Quinn, 40, Gaelic footballer (Stabannon Parnells, Louth senior team), heart attack.
- 7 February – Séamus Barron, 75, hurler (Rathnure, Wexford senior team) and selector (Rathnure, Wexford senior team).
- 10 February – Brian Dunning, 70, flautist and composer.
- 18 February – Hugh Niblock, 72, Gaelic footballer (Magherafelt, St. Gall's, Derry senior team).
- 19 February – Patrick Hughes, 78, cricketer (national team).
- 24 February
  - Paddy Murray, 68, journalist and writer, cancer.
  - Johnny McGovern, 89, hurler (Bennettsbridge, Kilkenny senior team, Leinster).
- 26 February – Paddy Roberts, 82, footballer (Shelbourne).
- 28 February
  - John A. Murphy, 95, historian and Senator (1977–1982 and 1987–1993).
  - Jimmy O'Donnell, 81, Gaelic footballer (Cootehill Celtic, Leitrim senior team, Cavan senior team, Connacht).

=== March ===
- 1 March – Hugh O'Shaughnessy, 87, journalist and writer.
- 4 March – Paul Shefflin, 41, hurler (Ballyhale Shamrocks, Kilkenny senior team).
- 6 March
  - Andrew Reddy, 89, Olympic boxer (1952, 1960).
  - Frank O'Farrell, 94, footballer (Cork United, West Ham, national team) and manager (Leicester City, Manchester United).
- 7 March – Christy O'Brien, 88, hurler (Borris-in-Ossory, Laois senior team, Leinster).
- 8 March
  - Peter Smithwick, 85, judge.
  - Patrick Duggan, 86, actor.
- 12 March – Pete St. John, 90, folk singer-songwriter.
- 14 March – Pierre Zakrzewski, 55, war photojournalist (Fox News), incoming fire during the battle of Kyiv.
- 15 March – Tom Duffy, 92, circus ringmaster.
- 19 March – Paul Kavanagh, 80, politician, Senator (1989).
- 21 March – Nicholas Furlong, 93, journalist, author and historian.
- 23 March – Dermot Fitzpatrick, 81, politician, TD (1987–1992 and 2002–2007) and Senator (1997–2002).
- 26 March – James Moriarty, 85, Roman Catholic prelate, auxiliary Bishop of Dublin (1991–2002) and Bishop of Kildare and Leighlin (2002–2010).
- 29 March – Peter McDonald, 98, Olympic footballer (1948).

=== April ===
- 1 April
  - Red Óg Murphy, 21, Gaelic footballer (Curry, Sligo senior team), suicide.
  - Raymond (Ray) Kearns, 91, teacher and founder of The Institute of Education (Dublin), Ireland's first private tuition school, in 1969.
- 4 April – John McNally, 89, Olympic boxer (1952).
- 8 April – Con Cluskey, 86, singer (The Bachelors).
- 13 April – Jimmy Leonard, 94, politician, TD (1973–1981 and 1982–1997) and Senator (1981–1982).
- 15 April – Michael O'Kennedy, 86, politician, TD (1969–1981, 1982–1992 and 1997–2002) and European Commissioner (1981–1982).
- 19 April – Paddy Flanagan, 92, Gaelic footballer and hurler (Mullingar Shamrocks, The Downs, St Loman's, Westmeath senior teams).
- 29 April – John Cooke, 78, judge.

=== May ===
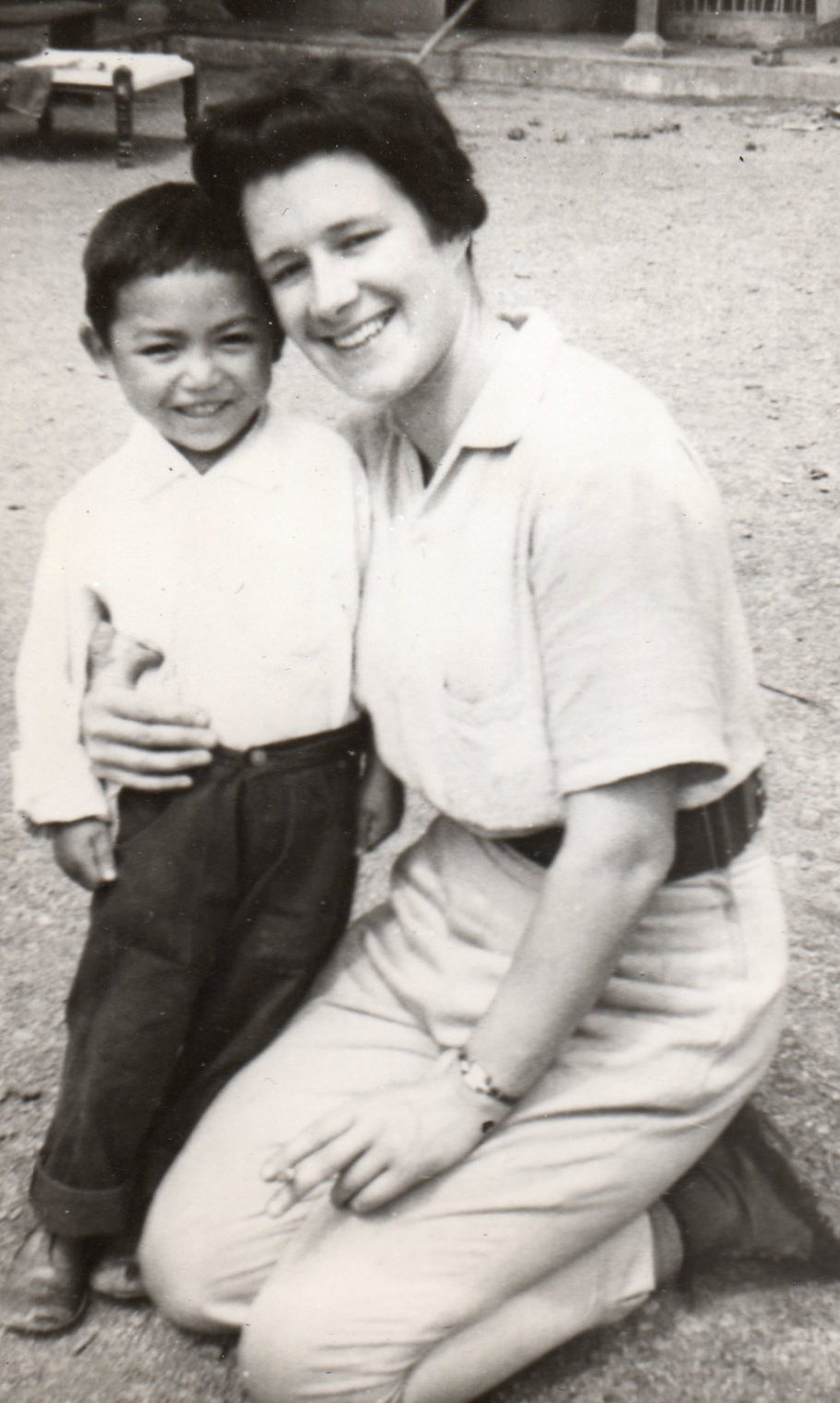
Dervla Murphy

- 6 May
  - Alan Gillis, 85, politician, MEP (1994–1999).
  - Seán Garvey, 69, musician and singer.
- 11 May – Patricia Cahill, 77, singer.
- 14 May – Donal Courtney, 52, actor, director and playwright.
- 18 May – Cathal Coughlan, 61, singer-songwriter.
- 22 May – Dervla Murphy, 90, travel writer.
- 31 May - Mary Jackman, 79, county councillor (1985–2014) and Senator (1989–1992 and 1997–2002).

=== June ===
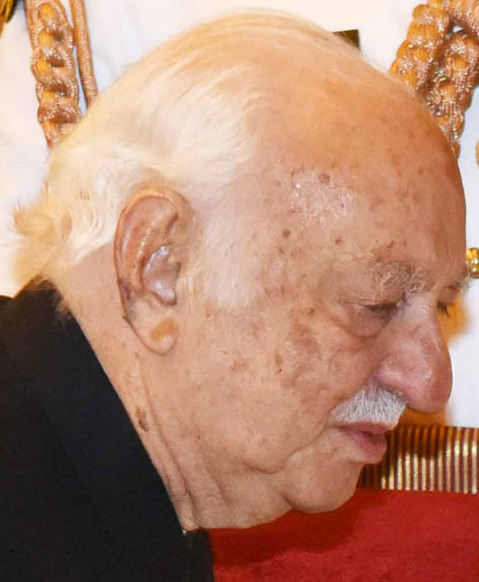
Pallonji Mistry

- 6 June – Séamus Looney, 72, Gaelic footballer and hurler (University College Cork, St. Finbarr's, Cork senior teams).
- 13 June – Noel Campbell, 72, footballer (St Patrick's Athletic, Fortuna Köln, Shamrock Rovers, national team).
- 15 June
  - Enda McGowan, 75, Gaelic footballer (Cavan senior team, Ulster).
  - Moss O'Connell, 87, Gaelic footballer and hurler (Abbeydorney, Kerry senior teams).
- 16 June
  - Richie Crean, 63, Gaelic footballer (Lucan Sarsfields, Dublin senior team) and selector (Dublin senior team).
  - Lexie Tynan, 89, rugby union player and athlete.
- 17 June – Damian Casey, 29, hurler (Eoghan Ruadh, Tyrone senior team), swimming accident. Born in Northern Ireland.
- 20 June
  - Thomas O'Riordan, 84, athlete and journalist.
  - Liam Cahill, 72, journalist, historian and civil servant.
- 26 June – Thomas Bewley, 95, psychiatrist.
- 28 June – Pallonji Mistry, 93, Indian-born construction tycoon.

=== July ===
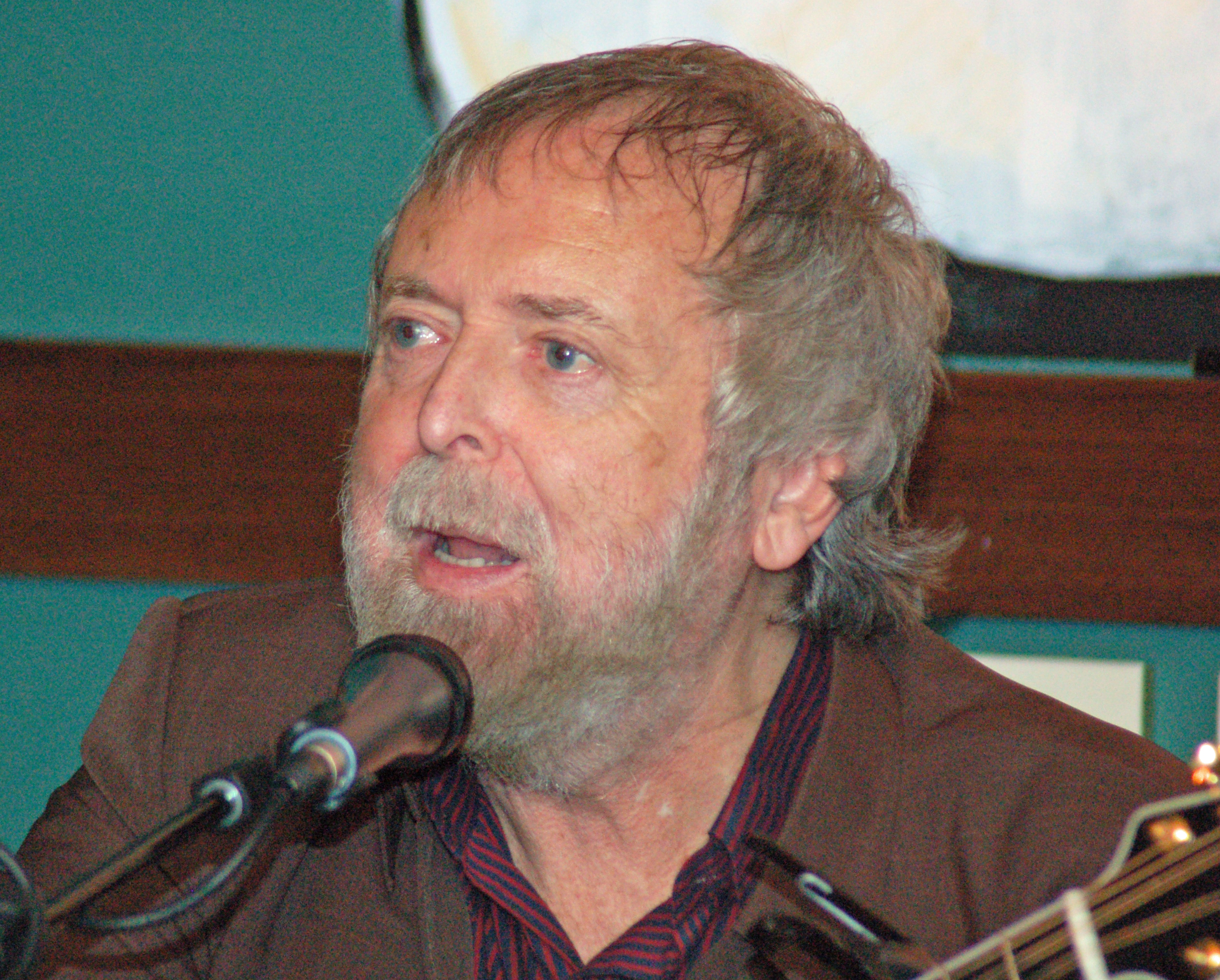
Mick Moloney

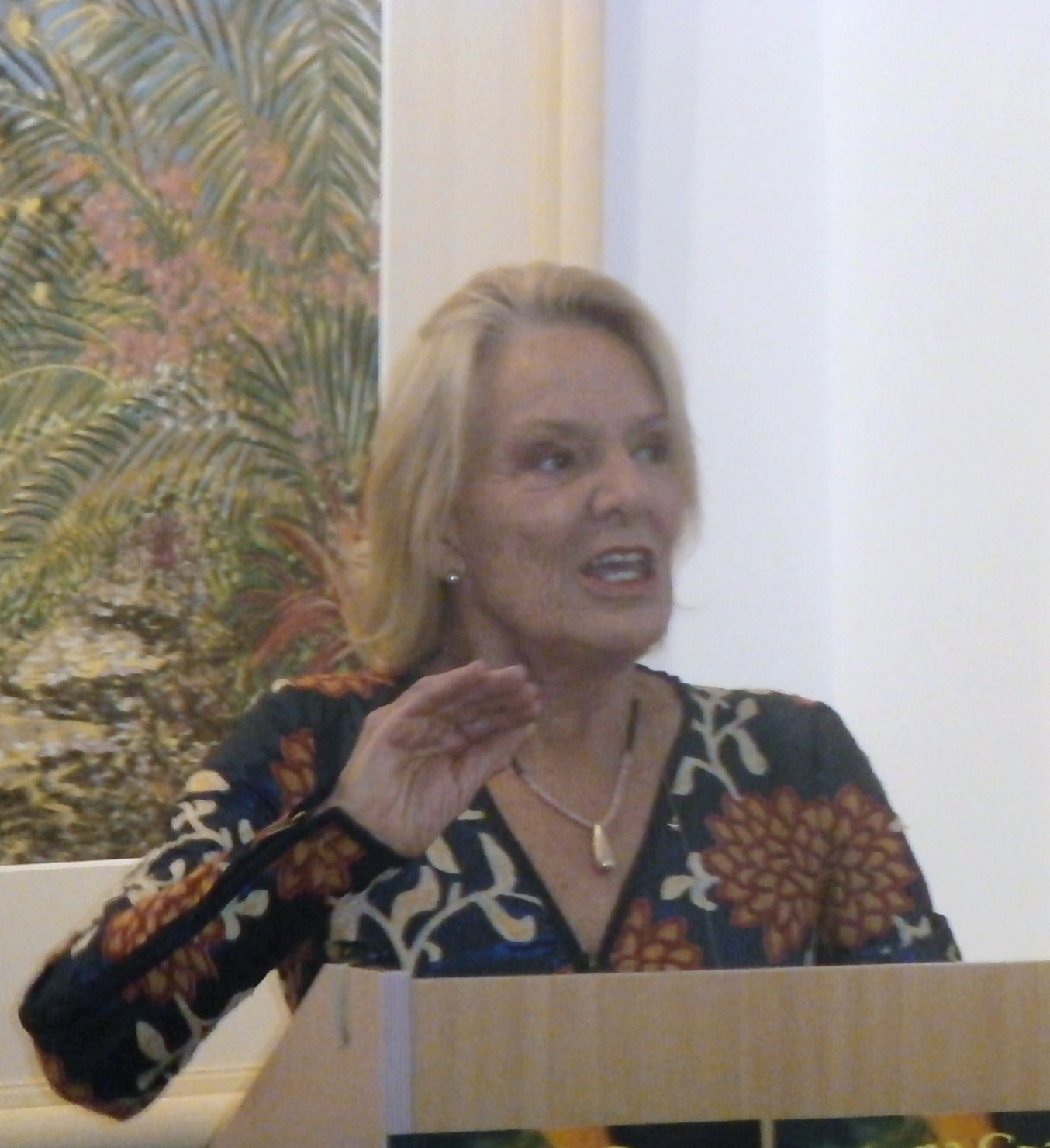
Pauline Bewick

- 1 July – Dermot O'Neill, 58, gardener, writer and broadcaster.
- 3 July – Eoin Farrell, 40, Gaelic footballer (Maryland, Westmeath senior team).
- 6 July – Joe Barry, 90, Director-General of RTÉ (1992–1997).
- 9 July – Diarmuid McCarthy, 66, Gaelic footballer (Naomh Abán, Muskerry, Cork senior team).
- 12 July
  - Colm McGurk, 55, Gaelic footballer and hurler (Lavey, Derry senior teams). Born in Northern Ireland.
  - Séamus Hughes, 69, judge and politician, TD (1992–1997).
- 14 July – Bobby Aylward, 67, politician, TD (2007–2011 and 2016–2020).
- 16 July – Ken Kennedy, 81, rugby union player (London Irish, British & Irish Lions).
- 19 July – George McGrath, 79, jockey.
- 22 July – Kieran Crotty, 91, politician, TD (1969–1989).
- 24 July – Kevin Beahan, 89, Gaelic footballer (St. Mary's, Louth senior team).
- 27 July – Mick Moloney, 77, musician, songwriter and folklorist.
- 28 July – Pauline Bewick, 86, English-born artist.

=== August ===
- 5 August – Dillon Quirke, 24, hurler (Clonouty-Rossmore, Tipperary senior team).
- 9 August – Kieran Denvir, 90, Gaelic footballer (UCD, Ballina Stephenites, Down senior team, Ulster). Born in Northern Ireland.
- 10 August – Peter Byrne, 86, sportswriter and author.
- 13 August – John Kelly, 78, journalist and author.
- 16 August – Frank Crowley, 83, politician, TD (1981–1997).
- 20 August – Séamus Freeman, 78, Roman Catholic prelate, bishop of Ossory (2007–2016).
- 21 August – Michael O'Connor, 108, centenarian believed to be Ireland's oldest man.
- 25 August – Patsy Gormley, 88, Gaelic footballer (Claudy, Derry senior team). Born in Northern Ireland.

=== September ===
- 2 September – Donal O'Keeffe, 59, Gaelic footballer (Clonmel Commercials, Tipperary senior team), cycling accident.
- 3 September
  - Martin Bailie, 60, hurler (Ballygalget, Down senior team), dementia. Born in Northern Ireland.
  - Paddy Kerrigan, 94, Gaelic footballer (Rhode, Offaly senior team) and trainer (Walsh Island).
- 4 September – Cyrus Mistry, 54, Indian born businessman, car accident.
- 5 September – Patricia Burke Brogan, 90, playwright, novelist, poet and artist.
- 10 September – Feargus Flood, 94, judge.
- 26 September – Hugh Hyland, 72, Gaelic footballer (Monasterevin, Kildare senior team) and horse breeder.
- 30 September – Brian Mullins, 68, Gaelic footballer (St. Vincent's, Dublin senior team, Leinster) and manager (Dublin, Derry).

=== October ===
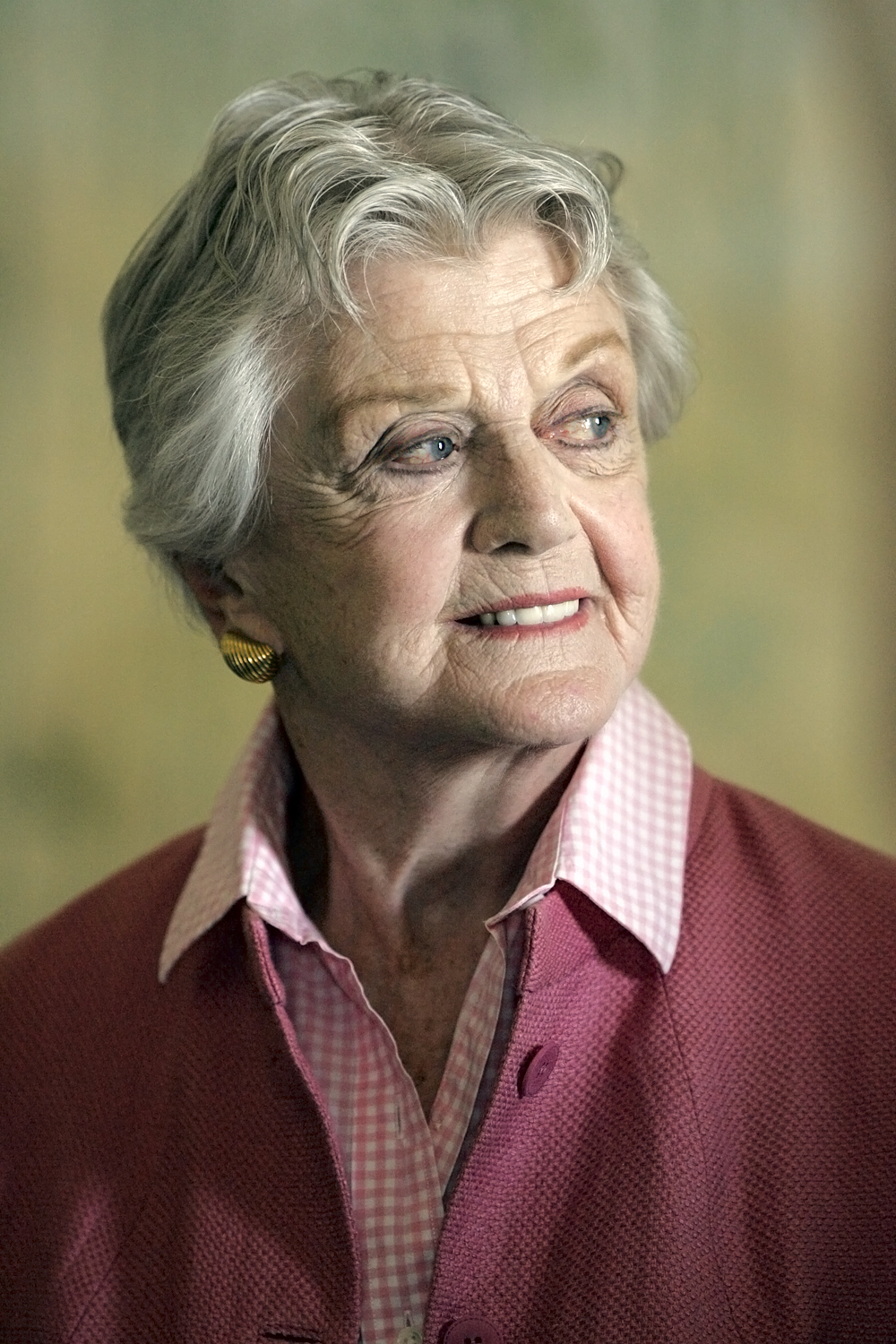
Angela Lansbury

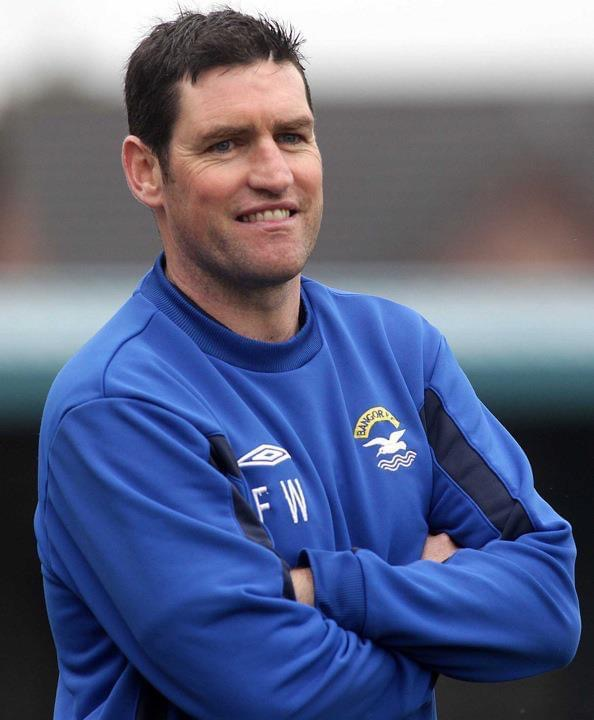
Frankie Wilson

- 4 October – Liam Ward, 92, jockey.
- 8 October – Val Joyce, 91, broadcaster.
- 9 October – Ted Crosbie, 91, businessman and publisher.
- 11 October – Angela Lansbury, 96, English-born actress (The Manchurian Candidate, Bedknobs and Broomsticks, Murder, She Wrote).
- 12 October
  - Billy Newman, 75, footballer (Home Farm, Bohemians, Shelbourne, Parkvilla, national team).
- 15 October – Noel Duggan, 73, musician (Clannad, The Duggans).
- 22 October
  - Pádraigh Griffin, 47, Gaelic footballer (Clonakilty, Cork senior team).
  - Patrick Coveney, 88, Roman Catholic prelate.
- 28 October
  - Frankie Wilson, 52, Gaelic footballer (Lámh Dhearg, Antrim senior team) and footballer (Crewe United). Born in Northern Ireland.
  - P. J. McElroy, 90, Gaelic footballer (Liatroim Fontenoys, Down senior team, Ulster). Born in Northern Ireland.
- 29 October – Donal Moynihan, 81, politician, TD (1982–1989 and 1992–2007).

=== November ===
- 1 November – Vinny Harvey, 85, Gaelic footballer (Éire Óg, Carlow senior team) and manager (Kiltegan, Tinahely).
- 2 November – Brigid Hogan-O'Higgins, 90, politician, TD (1957–1977).
- 6 November – Paul McNaughton, 69, footballer (Shelbourne, Bray Wanderers) and rugby union player (Leinster, national team).
- 7 November
  - Éamonn Darcy, 89, footballer (Shelbourne, Dundalk, Shamrock Rovers, national B team).
  - Frank Henry, 67, Gaelic footballer (St. Mary's, Leixlip, Sligo senior team).
  - Austin Noonan, 89, footballer (Cork Celtic, Cork Hibernians).
  - Brian O'Doherty, 94, art critic, writer, visual artist, and academic.
- 8 November
  - Garry Roberts, 72, musician.
  - Mick Lawler, 80, hurler (Coon), Carnew Emmets, Conahy Shamrocks, Kilkenny and Wicklow senior teams.
- 13 November
  - Jerry Holland, 66, rugby union player (Cork Constitution, Munster, national team), head coach and manager (Munster).
  - Éamon Phoenix, 69, historian and author.
- 14 November
  - Vicky Phelan, 48, campaigner for fellow victims of the CervicalCheck cancer scandal.
  - Tom Murphy, 79, hurler (Rower-Inistioge, Kilkenny senior team).
- 16 November – Austin Garvin, 76, Gaelic football manager (Mayo minor team) and sports journalist.
- 19 November
  - Roger G. H. Downer, 79, academic administrator, president of the University of Limerick (1998–2006).
  - Rory Dwyer, 89, footballer (Shelbourne).
  - Mick Ellard, 76, sports journalist (Irish Examiner).
- 23 November – Éamonn Wallace, 63, hurler (Erin's Own, Kilkenny senior team).
- 24 November – Seán McCague, 77, Gaelic footballer (Scotstown), manager (Monaghan senior team) and GAA President (2000–2003).
- 26 November – Martin Drennan, 78, Roman Catholic prelate, bishop of Galway, Kilmacduagh and Kilfenora (2005–2016).
- 27 November – Mick Meagan, 88, footballer (Everton, Drogheda, national team) and manager (national team).

=== December ===
- 3 December – Michael Collins, 82, politician, TD (1997–2007).
- 4 December – Kevin Kilmurray, 72, Gaelic footballer (UCD, Offaly senior team) and manager (Offaly senior team).
- 12 December – Jacqueline Stanley, 94, British-born painter.
- 16 December – Peter Daly, 82, Gaelic footballer (Ballinamare, Offaly senior team).
- 18 December – Peter Darby, 84, Gaelic footballer and hurler (Trim, Meath senior teams, Leinster).
- 21 December – John Berchmans Conway, 93, Roman Catholic religious sister and teacher.
- 22 December – Ronnie Lamont, 81, rugby union player (Instonians, national team, British & Irish Lions).
- 26 December – Thomas Meaney, 91, politician, TD (1965–1982) and Minister of State (1980–1981).

== See also ==
- Politics of the Republic of Ireland
