= Valerie French =

Valerie French may refer to:

- Valerie French (socialite) (1909–1997), English socialite
- Valerie French (actress) (1928–1990), English film, television and stage performer
- Valerie French (born 1962), American wrestling personality better known as Sunshine
- Valerie French (novel), a 1923 novel by Dornford Yates
- Murder of Valerie French, an Irish woman murdered by her husband in 2019

== See also ==
- French (surname)
