= An Fear Rua =

- Homepage in 2008
- Available in: English, Irish
- Dissolved: 2012
- Headquarters: Dublin, Ireland
- Website: anfearrua.com (inactive)
- Commercial: Yes
- Users: 10,277 (2012)
- Launched: September 2000
- Current status: Inactive

An Fear Rua (Irish: [ənˠ fʲaɾˠ ɾˠuə], lit. 'the red-haired man') was an Irish website, active from 2000 to 2012, notable as an early online discussion board for Gaelic games.

== History ==
An Fear Rua was founded by Liam Cahill in 2000. Its name is an allusion to An Fear Ciúin ('the quiet man'), a pseudonym used by the GAA correspondent for The Irish Press.

In 2002, the Sunday Independent wrote of An Fear Rua that the site was "Full of opinion, humour and insight, it is an eclectic mixture of tongue-in-cheek fact and fiction."

The site closed in 2012, Cahill pointing to falling advertising revenue and concerns over libel laws.
