= Éamonn Wallace =

Irish hurler (1959–2022)

Personal information
- Native name: Éamonn de Bhailís (Irish)
- Born: 5 September 1959 Castlecomer, County Kilkenny, Ireland
- Died: 23 November 2022 (aged 63) Castlecomer, County Kilkenny, Ireland
- Occupation: Fuel merchant
- Height: 5 ft 11 in (180 cm)

Sport
- Sport: Hurling
- Position: Midfield
Club
- Years: Club
- Erin's Own
Club titles
- Leinster titles: 0
Inter-county
- Years: County
- 1981–1984: Kilkenny
Inter-county titles
- Leinster titles: 2
- All-Irelands: 2
- NHL: 2
- All Stars: 0

Éamonn Wallace (5 September 1959 – 23 November 2022) was an Irish hurler who played for Kilkenny Senior Championship club Erin's Own. He also played for the Kilkenny senior hurling team and was a member of the All-Ireland Championship-winning teams in 1982 and 1983.

== Career ==
Wallace first played hurling with the Erin's Own club in Castlecomer. He enjoyed some success in the underage grades, winning a divisional minor medal in 1975 and a Kilkenny U21HC title in 1978. Wallace subsequently joined the Erin's Own senior team.

Wallace first appeared on the inter-county scene with Kilkenny as a member of the minor team. He was at full-forward when the team beat Cork in the 1977 All-Ireland minor final. Wallace was also part of the under-21 team that was beaten by Tipperary in the 1980 All-Ireland under-21 final. He subsequently joined the senior team and was an unused substitute for Kilkenny's back-to-back National League, Leinster SHC and All-Ireland SHC success in 1982 and 1983.

== Death ==
Wallace died on 23 November 2022, at the age of 63.

== Honours ==
Erin's Own

- Kilkenny Under-21 Hurling Championship: 1978

Kilkenny

- All-Ireland Senior Hurling Championship: 1982, 1983
- Leinster Senior Hurling Championship: 1982, 1983
- National Hurling League: 1981-82, 1982-83
- Leinster Under-21 Hurling Championship: 1980
- All-Ireland Minor Hurling Championship: 1977
- Leinster Minor Hurling Championship: 1977
