= Una O'Hagan =

Irish Newsreader

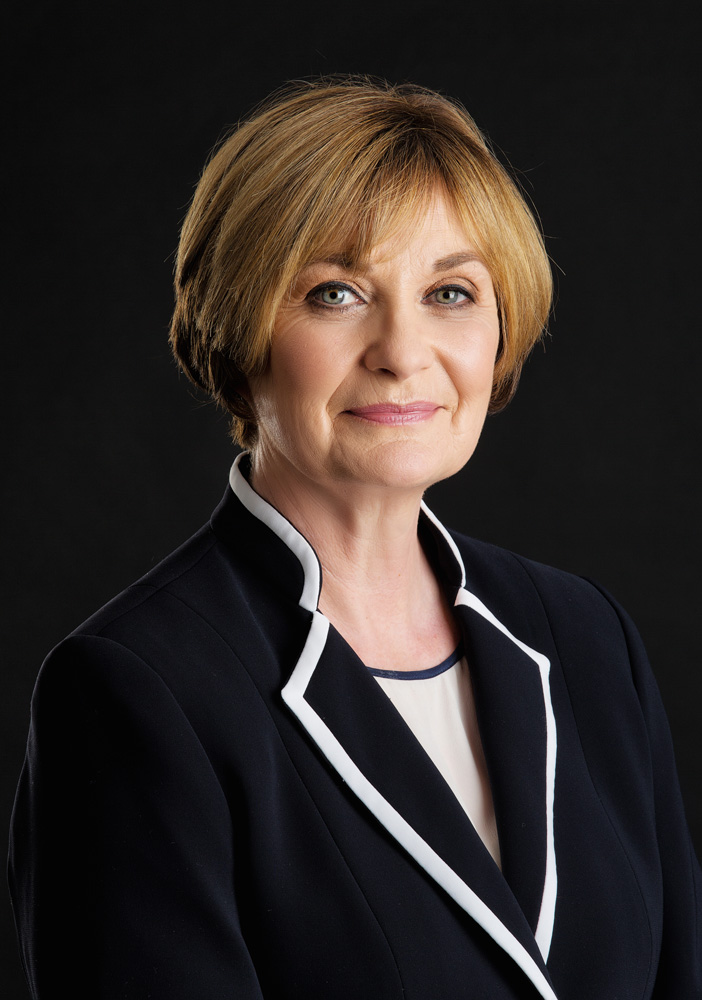
- Born: 1962 (age 63–64); Dublin, County Dublin Ireland
- Education: Dublin Institute of Technology
- Occupations: Journalist; newsreader
- Years active: 1983–present
- Employer: RTÉ
- Notable credit: RTÉ News
- Spouse(s): Colm Keane (until his death, 2022)
- Children: 1 son (deceased)

Una O'Hagan (born 1962) is an Irish author, journalist and former newsreader with RTÉ, Ireland's national radio and television station. She presented the main television news programmes Six One News, Nine O'Clock News and One O'Clock News including all other news bulletins on both radio and television. For nine years, from 1996 to 2005, she co-presented the station's flagship news programme Six One News with Bryan Dobson. O'Hagan presented her last news bulletin on Sunday 25 February 2018.

O'Hagan was born in Dublin in 1962 and attended Dominican College, Eccles Street. She studied journalism at the Dublin Institute of Technology, graduating in 1982. The following year, 1983, she joined RTÉ, where she worked as a newsreader on RTÉ Radio 2. In early 1986, she became a member of RTÉ's news reporting staff.

In 1990, in Zambia, she met and interviewed Nelson Mandela, who had been released from captivity on Robben Island just two weeks earlier. In 1992, she accompanied Ireland's first woman president, Mary Robinson, on a state visit to Australia, having already covered her election as President of Ireland (Uachtaráin na hÉireann) in 1990.

She also reported on the release of Beirut hostage Brian Keenan in 1990, the negotiations in Brussels for the new EU constitution in 2003, and she co-presented RTÉ's coverage of the events of 9/11.

As a newscaster, she hosted live programmes on the deaths of former Taoiseach Jack Lynch in 1999 and Garret FitzGerald in 2011, the visit of Queen Elizabeth II to Ireland in 2011, and the 2012 United States presidential election.

She was married to author and former RTÉ broadcaster, the late Colm Keane. They lost their only son (and only child) Seán to cancer in 2007. They wrote four books together: the No.1 bestseller The Little Flower, St. Thérèse of Lisieux: The Irish Connection, published in September 2018, and the bestselling book Animal Crackers: Irish Pet Stories, published in June 2016. Their most recent co-written books were The Village of Bernadette: Lourdes, Stories, Miracles and Cures - The Irish Connection, published in September 2019, and The Book of St. Brigid, published in September 2021.
