= Diarmuid Rossa Phelan =

Irish academic

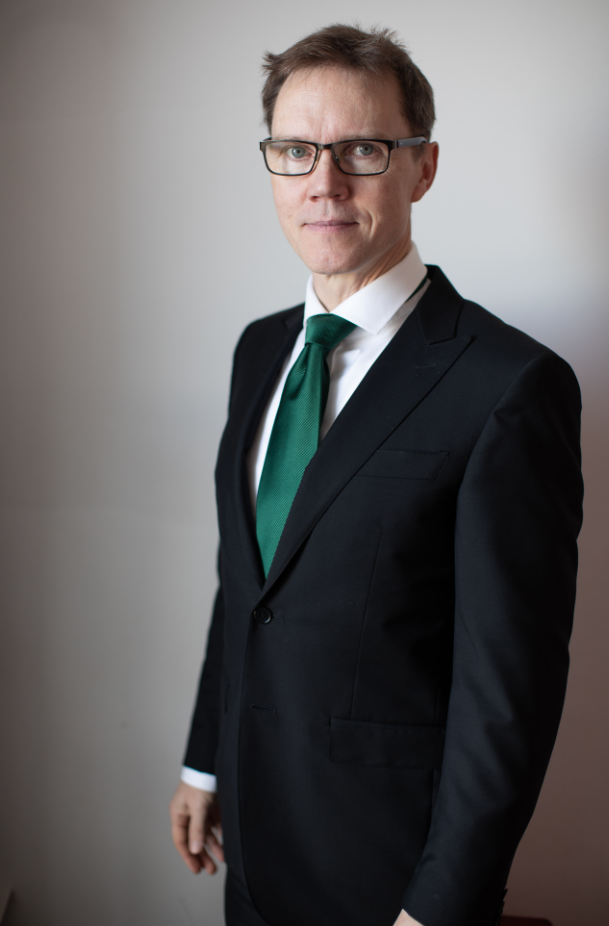
Diarmuid Rossa Phelan

Diarmuid Rossa Phelan is a farmer, senior counsel, professor at the School of Law, Trinity College Dublin, fellow of Trinity College Dublin (TCD), and a former member of TCD's Board, to which he was twice elected. He was also twice elected Chairman of TCD's Board of Fellows.

He is a member of the Bar of England and Wales, the Bar of Northern Ireland and the New York State Bar Association.

== Career ==
He was made called to the bar in 1994 and made senior counsel in 2008.

He was a counsel for the Minister for Communications, Marine and Natural Resources at the Moriarty Tribunal on the issuing of the second GSM licence.

He represented the companies Phone Paid Services Association Ltd, Modeva Interactive and Zamano Plc before the High Court in 2012.

He represented several high-profile pro bono actions in referendums and refugees against deportation orders, including in 2017 before the High Court where he represented a mother and two children who were being deported to Nigeria after residing in Ireland for over a decade.

In October 2008, he spoke at the Oireachtas Sub-Committee on Ireland's Future in the European Union.

He has authored many legal articles and books, including Revolt or Revolution: At the Constitutional Boundaries of the European Community (1997) and Basic Community Cases (1997), which he co-authored with Bernard Rudden, Professor of Comparative Law at University of Oxford.

During the debate over the Thirty-third Amendment of the Constitution of Ireland to establish a Court of Appeal, he suggested that giving the Supreme Court absolute discretion to select which cases to hear was dangerous and would need to be monitored for mission creep.

== Personal life ==
On 3 August 2008, he was seriously injured when the car he was in was hit by a car driven by Catherine O'Meara. After the accident he was cut from the vehicle and taken to Nenagh Hospital. He suffered from a spinal injury and over a decade later was still being treated. A court case to determine damages was settled between him and O'Meara.

He farms mixed organic livestock in County Wexford and near Tallaght, County Dublin. The farms run training programs for veterinary and engineering students,

=== Death of Keith Conlon ===
Keith Conlon was shot at Phelan's farm near Tallaght on 22 February 2022 and died in Tallaght University Hospital two days later. Phelan was charged with murder and initially denied bail. He was later granted bail on 8 April after an appeal. On 14 October 2024 he pleaded not guilty to the murder of Keith Conlon. The trial began two days later in the Central Criminal Court.

The court heard how Phelan had shot a dog he believed to have been worrying his sheep during lambing season with a Winchester rifle on the day in question, when three men suddenly emerged from nearby woodland and ran towards him shouting threats. Phelan then produced an 8-shot revolver while retreating backwards and warning the men to halt, and when they continued to advance Phelan fired 3 warning shots above their heads in a left-to-right arc, with the final shot hitting Conlon behind the top of the right ear as he turned his head. Garda ballistics experts subsequently test-fired the same Smith & Wesson revolver and discovered that over 90% of their shots landed below the point of aim, which defense lawyers argued was a major factor in Conlon being accidentally shot by Phelan.

On 3 January 2025, Phelan was unanimously found not guilty of murder after seven hours of jury deliberations. The jury accepted that Phelan had acted on self-defence using no more force than reasonably necessary.
