= Paddy Flanagan (Westmeath Gaelic footballer) =

Irish Gaelic footballer and hurler (1930–2022)

Personal information
- Native name: Pádraig Ó Flanagáin (Irish)
- Nickname: The Gent
- Born: 29 November 1930 Turin, County Westmeath, Ireland
- Died: 19 April 2022 (aged 91) Mullingar, County Westmeath, Ireland
- Occupation: Psychiatric nurse

Sport
- Sport: Gaelic football
- Position: Full-back
Clubs
- Years: Club
- Mullingar Shamrocks; The Downs; St Loman's
Club titles
- Westmeath titles: 2
Inter-county
- Years: County
- 1949-1965: Westmeath GAA
Inter-county titles
- Leinster titles: 0
- All-Irelands: 0
- All Stars: 0

Patrick Flanagan (29 November 1930 – 19 April 2022) was an Irish Gaelic footballer and hurler who played for club sides Mullingar Shamrocks, The Downs, and St Loman's and at inter-county level as a dual player with the Westmeath senior teams. He usually lined out as a defender. Paddy married Judy Harte in August 1957. They had four children, Fergal, Brian, Kevin and Claire. They have six grandchildren, Paul, Aoife, Ailish, Niamh, Sean and Tara. Paddy was very proud of his children and grandchildren.

== Early life ==
Born in Reynella, Turin he moved to Mullingar at a young age where he was initially introduced to Gaelic football. He won his first medal with St Mary's CBS playing with the college in the Columb Cup Final in Athy in 1946. He played his minor football with Mullingar, winning championship medals in 1946 and 1947. In 1948 he played Junior football with the Downs.

Paddy remarkably represented Westmeath at minor, senior and junior level all while juggling his job as county secretary. He captained the Westmeath Junior team beaten by Wexford in the Leinster Final of 1963.

In 1948 he entered the psychiatric services and transferred to St Lomans Mental Hospital. Paddy was part of the historic 1961 and 1963 Championship winning teams.

He was elected secretary of the mental hospital club and three years later appointed assistant secretary of the Westmeath county board. On top of this he wrote a weekly column for the examiner under the name "Aindrias O" which lasted all of fifty years. He was elected county secretary in 1954 and held that position until 1969. As well as this he also served as delegate to the Leinster council and treasurer of the council.

Paddy served as the first PRO for Westmeath from 1970 until 2000 collecting 6 McNamee awards for "best county final programme"- a testament to his tremendous work.

In 2004 Flanagan was the first Westmeath/ St Loman's man to receive the GAA president's award for services to the GAA and in the same year joined the "hall of fame of Leinster greats" - the first from his club and county.

In 2007 he received the inaugural Westmeath Examiner/Park Hotel football hall of fame sports award for his contribution to sport. He was also recognized by the Westmeath/Dublin association who selected Paddy as "Westmeath man of the year" in 1974.

During his time on Leinster council, paddy was chairman of the Leinster Centenary committee. Paddy retired from St Lomans in the late sixties and thoroughly enjoyed the recent success of the Club.

His sons Brian and Kevin, grandchildren Ailish, Niamh, Sean and Tara have worn the blue jersey, his daughter in law Cait has also won junior, intermediate and Senior honors with the Blues.

In 2013 Paddy Flanagan presented the Flanagan Cup to Lomans Captains Paul Sharry and John Heslin after a fifty year drought. In truth he had love for the Gaa and worked tirelessly devoting his entire life to the sport.

== Playing career ==
Flanagan played Gaelic football as a schoolboy at St. Mary's College in Mullingar. He later played at club football with Mullingar Shamrocks before later lining out with The Downs. As a player with the St Loman's club, he won two Westmeath SFC titles. Flanagan first appeared at inter-county level as a member of the Westmeath minor football team. He made his senior team debut in 1949 and was a mainstay of the team until 1965. Flanagan also lined out with the Westmeath senior hurling team.

== Administrative career ==
Paddy Flanagan first became involved in the administrative affairs of the Association when he was appointed secretary of the St. Loman's club in 1949. He subsequently served as assistant secretary of the Westmeath County Board before taking the position of secretary from 1956 to 1969. Flanagan was the county board's PRO from 1970 to 2000 and also served as a Leinster Council delegate. The cup awarded to the winners of the Westmeath SFC is named in his honour.

== Death ==
Paddy Flanagan died on 19 April 2022, aged 91. Surrounded by his loving family.

== Honours ==
St. Loman's

- Westmeath Senior Football Championship: 1961, 1963

Sporting positions
Preceded by Paddy McCabe	Secretary of the Westmeath County Board; 1956-1969	Succeeded by Tony Gilligan
