= Colm Keane =

Irish author, broadcaster, and journalist (1951–2022)

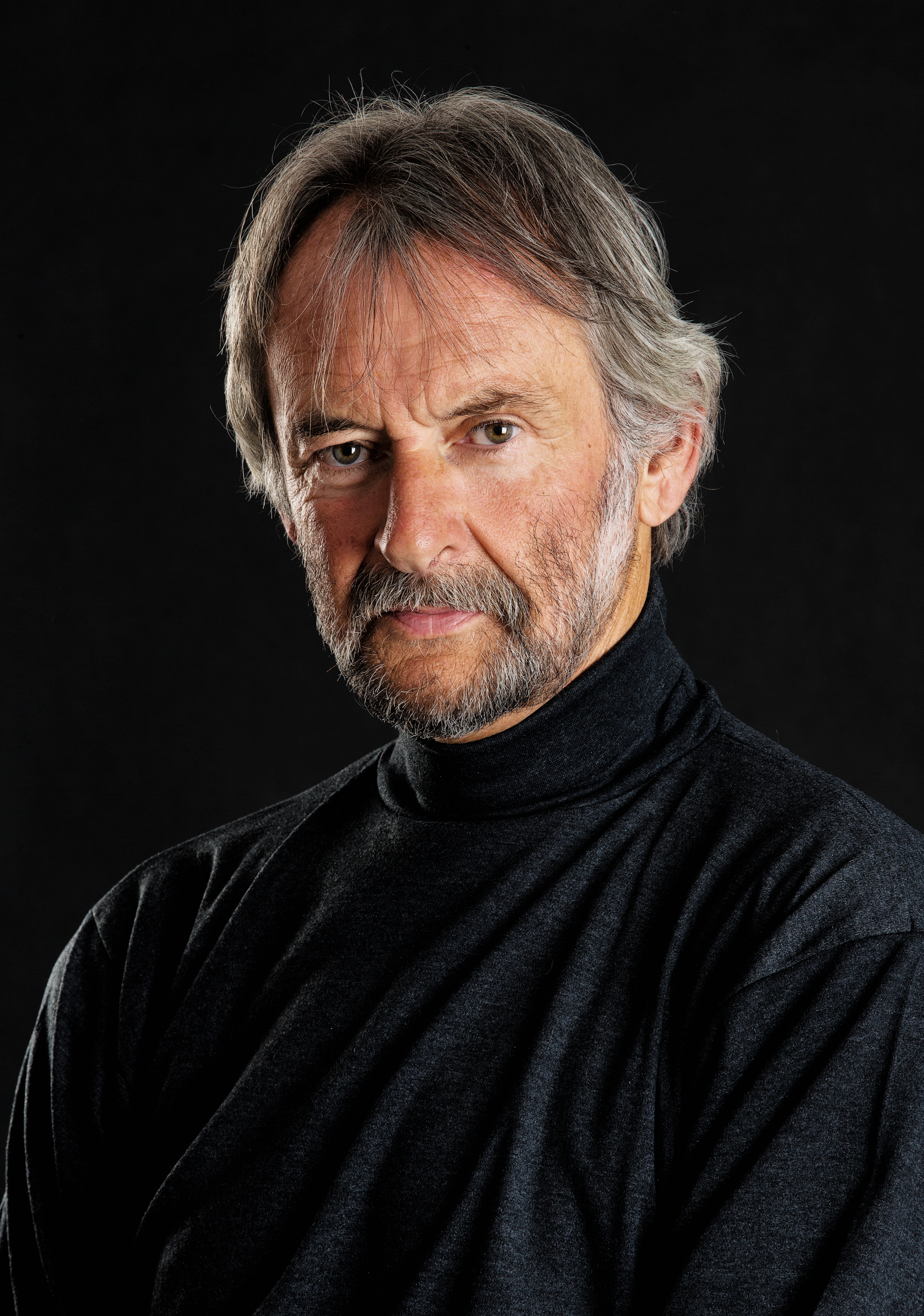
- Keane in 2014
- Born: 1951; Youghal, County Cork, Munster, Ireland
- Died: 22 January 2022 (aged 70); Waterford, County Waterford, Munster, Ireland
- Education: Trinity College Dublin; Georgetown University
- Occupations: Author, broadcaster, journalist
- Years active: 1977–2022
- Spouse: Una O'Hagan
- Children: 1 son (deceased)

Colm Keane (1951 – 22 January 2022) was an Irish author, broadcaster and journalist. Originally from County Cork, he studied economics at Trinity College in Dublin and Georgetown University in Washington D.C. He joined Raidió Teilifís Éireann as a broadcaster in the late 1970s, and produced and contributed to several shows with a current affairs and documentary focus. After his retirement from broadcasting in 2003, Keane became a full-time writer, authoring 29 books, including eight Irish best-sellers.

== Early life and education ==
Keane was born in Youghal, County Cork, in 1951. He attended Trinity College Dublin, where he graduated with a B.A. (Mod.) degree and was subsequently awarded an M.A. in economics and political science. He undertook postgraduate studies at Georgetown University in Washington D.C., where he obtained an M.A. degree in economics.

== Broadcasting career ==
In 1977, Keane joined the Irish national broadcaster Raidió Teilifís Éireann, where he initially worked as a television journalist. He co-presented the weekly investigative series Public Account with Pat Kenny, and he worked as a reporter on the current affairs programme Today Tonight. While in television, Keane won a Glaxo Fellowship for European Science Writers for his scripting and presentation of the science series A Future in Mind.

In the early 1980s, Keane moved to RTÉ Radio 1, where he worked as a reporter, presenter, producer and series producer. He won a Jacob's Award in 1988 for American Profiles, which featured a visit to a prison death row in Texas, a profile of an Auschwitz survivor living in New York, and a feature documentary on NASA astronaut James Irwin.

As a radio producer, Keane compiled and presented documentaries based on interviews with musical figures including Burt Bacharach, Cat Stevens, Davy Jones of the Monkees, Dave Davies of the Kinks, Chubby Checker, Engelbert Humperdinck, Pete Seeger, Val Doonican, Glen Campbell, Neil Sedaka and more than 140 other performers and musicians.

Among his documentary subjects was the former Manchester United footballer George Best. He also produced and presented A Belfast Game, profiling the Troubles in Northern Ireland through the experiences of the Ardoyne Kickhams Under-16 football team. A Belfast Game inspired Andrew Lloyd Webber's West End theatre production, The Beautiful Game.

Keane's radio presentation work included Studio 10, which he co-presented with Mary McAleese, later the president of Ireland.

== Career as an author ==
After retiring from broadcasting in 2003, Keane became a full-time author. He wrote the Irish national best-sellers Going Home (No. 1), We'll Meet Again (No. 1), Heading for the Light (No. 1), The Distant Shore and Forewarned. Most of the content of these books was based on research with survivors of near-death experiences.

Keane also wrote three national No. 1 best-sellers on the Italian saint Padre Pio – Padre Pio: The Irish Connection, Padre Pio: The Scent of Roses and Padre Pio: Irish Encounters with the Saint. He published a further No. 1 best-seller, co-authored with his wife Una O'Hagan, entitled The Little Flower, St. Thérèse of Lisieux: The Irish Connection. He collaborated with O'Hagan on the best-selling book Animal Crackers: Irish Pet Stories, published in 2016. Other co-written books are the best-selling The Village of Bernadette: Lourdes, Stories, Miracles and Cures – The Irish Connection, published in 2019, and The Book of St. Brigid, published in 2021.

Keane founded the publishing company Capel Island Press in 2008. He authored the company's first book, The Beatles Irish Concerts. Since its inception, Capel Island Press has published six No. 1 best-sellers.

== Personal life ==
Keane was married for nearly 30 years to Una O'Hagan, a former RTÉ newsreader, until his death. They had one child (Seán), who died in 2007.

Keane lived in Waterford, where he died from cancer on 22 January 2022, at the age of 70.

== Selected bibliography ==
- The Book of St. Brigid, Capel Island (2021) ISBN 978-1-9995920-3-5
- The Village of Bernadette: Lourdes, Stories, Miracles and Cures – The Irish Connection, Capel Island (2019)
- The Little Flower, St.Thérèse of Lisieux: The Irish Connection, Capel Island (2018)
- Padre Pio: Irish Encounters with the Saint, Capel Island (2017)
- Animal Crackers: Irish Pet Stories, Capel Island (2016)
- Heading for the Light, Capel Island (2014) ISBN 978-0-9559133-6-5
- Padre Pio: The Scent of Roses, Capel Island (2013)
- We'll Meet Again, Capel Island (2013)
- Forewarned, Capel Island (2011)
- The Distant Shore, Capel Island (2010)
- Going Home, Capel Island (2009) ISBN 978-0-9559133-1-0
- The Beatles Irish Concerts, Capel Island (2008)
- Padre Pio: The Irish Connection, Mainstream (2007) ISBN 978-1-84596-285-2
- Ireland's Soccer Top 20, Mainstream (2004) ISBN 978-1-84596-033-9
- Gaelic Football's Top 20, Mainstream (2003) ISBN 978-1-84018-886-8
- Hurling's Top 20, Mainstream (2002) ISBN 978-1-84018-775-5
- A Cut above the Rest, Town House (1999) ISBN 978-1-86059-106-8
- The ABC of Bullying (with Marie Murray), Mercier (1998) ISBN 978-1-85635-237-6
- The Teenage Years (with Marie Murray), Mercier (1997) ISBN 978-1-85635-195-9
- The Stress File, Blackwater (1997)
- Death & Dying, Mercier (1995) ISBN 978-1-85635-113-3
- Nervous Breakdown, Mercier (1994) ISBN 978-1-85635-080-8
- The Jobs Crisis, Mercier (1993) ISBN 978-1-85635-053-2
- Mental Health in Ireland, Gill and Macmillan (1991) ISBN 978-0-7171-1877-9
