= Lexie Tynan =

Irish athlete (1933–2022)

Personal information
- Nationality: Irish
- Born: 12 June 1933 Dublin, Ireland
- Died: 16 June 2022 (aged 89) Burlington, Ontario, Canada

Sport
- Sport: Athlete

John Alex Tynan (12 June 1933 – 16 June 2022) was an Irish athlete and rugby union player. He was selected to compete at the 1952 Summer Olympics.

== Career ==
Tynan started his sporting career as a rugby union player with Old Belvedere. He was part of the team that won consecutive Leinster Senior Cups, later played for Leinster and also had trials for the national team. Tynan was national sprint champion in 1951 and represented Ireland at the 1952 Summer Olympics, but he did not take part in any races.

== Personal life and death ==
Tynan emigrated to Canada in the 1980s and worked for Gilbert Rugby. He died on 16 June 2022, aged 89.

== Honours ==
Old Belvedere

- Leinster Senior Cup: 1951, 1952
