= Colin Quinn (Gaelic footballer) =

Louth Gaelic footballer (1982–2022)

Personal information
- Native name: Cóilín Mac Coinne (Irish)
- Born: 8 October 1981 Stabannon, County Louth, Leinster, Ireland
- Died: 3 February 2022 (aged 40) Australia
- Occupation: Carpenter

Sport
- Sport: Gaelic football
- Position: Centre-back
Club
- Years: Club
- Stabannon Parnells
Club titles
- Louth titles: 1
Inter-county
- Years: County
- Louth
Inter-county titles
- Leinster titles: 0
- All-Irelands: 0
- NFL: 0
- All Stars: 0

Colin Quinn (8 October 1981 – 3 February 2022) was an Irish Gaelic footballer who played at club level with Stabannon Parnells and at inter-county level with the Louth senior football team. He usually lined out as a defender.

== Career ==
Quinn first came to prominence as a Gaelic footballer at club level with Stabannon Parnells. He was just 17-years-old when he lined out at centre-back when Stabannon beat Kilkerley Emmets to win the Louth SFC title in 1999. Following on from this, Quinn captained the Louth Minor football team in 1999 and was also named Minor player of the year. He progressed onto the Louth under-21 football team, with whom he lined out for two seasons, and made his senior team debut in 2002. Quinn's inter-county career was a brief one, however he continued to line out for Parnells at club level and served as team captain in 2004 and 2008.

== Personal life and death ==
Quinn worked as a carpenter but emigrated to Australia following the 2008 economic downturn. He died on 3 February 2022, at the age of 40.

== Honours ==
- Louth Senior Football Championship (1): 1999
- ACC Cup (1): 2000
- Kevin Mullen Shield (1): 2008
