= Jimmy Campbell (fiddler) =

Irish musician (1937–2022)

- Born: 1937; Glenties, County Donegal, Ireland
- Died: 22 January 2022 (aged 84) Glenties, County Donegal, Ireland
- Genres: Traditional Irish music
- Instrument: Fiddle

James Campbell (1937 – 22 January 2022) was an Irish musician. He is regarded as one of Donegal's most influential traditional musicians.

== Biography ==
Born in 1937, Campbell grew up in a house that was steeped in Donegal fiddle music. His father and grandfather were well known fiddle players. The Campbell home was a regular venue for musicians to come to visit and play music, including both Mickey and John Doherty. Campbell emigrated to Scotland where he worked as a tunnel tiger, and later settled in London. He was a mainstay of the traditional music scene in Britain, and has associations with Brendan McGlinchey, the Dwyers of Ardgroom and Paddy Conroy, the Galway accordion player. Campbell returned to Glenties in 1988. His son Peter is also a renowned fiddle player.

== Death ==
Campbell died in Glenties on 22 January 2022, aged 84.
