= Frank Henry (Gaelic footballer) =

Irish Gaelic footballer (1955–2022)

Personal information
- Native name: Prionsias Ó hInnéirí (Irish)
- Born: 1955 Riverstown, County Sligo, Ireland
- Died: 7 November 2022 (aged 67) Leixlip, County Kildare, Ireland

Sport
- Sport: Gaelic football
- Position: Left wing-forward
Clubs
- Years: Club
- Shamrocks Gaels; St Mary's, Leixlip
Club titles
- Sligo titles: 0
Inter-county
- Years: County
- 1974–1986: Sligo
Inter-county titles
- Connacht titles: 1
- All-Irelands: 0
- NFL: 0
- All Stars: 0

Francis G. Henry (1955 – 7 November 2022) was an Irish Gaelic footballer who played for the Shamrocks Gaels and St Mary's, Leixlip clubs, and at senior level for the Sligo county team.

== Career ==
Henry played underage football with Knockalassa before winning a Sligo Vocational Schools SFC title with Coola Vocational School in 1969. He later joined the Shamrock Gaels club and won consecutive Sligo MFC titles in 1972 and 1973. Henry added a Sligo U21FC title to his collection in 1975 before claiming his first adult silverware when Shamrock Gaels won the inaugural Sligo IFC title in 1979.

Henry first appeared on the inter-county scene with Sligo as a member of the minor team. He was soon drafted onto the senior team and made his debut during the 1973–74 league. Henry was at left wing-forward when Sligo won their first Connacht SFC title in 47 years after a defeat of Mayo in the 1975 final replay. He continued to line out at inter-county level at various times until 1986, by which time he had joined the St. Mary's club in Leixlip.

== Death ==
Henry died on 7 November 2022, at the age of 67.

== Honours ==
Coola Vocational School

- Sligo Vocational Schools Senior Football Championship: 1969

Shamrock Gaels

- Sligo Intermediate Football Championship: 1979
- Sligo Under-21 Football Championship: 1975
- Sligo Minor Football Championship: 1972, 1973

Sligo

- Connacht Senior Football Championship: 1975
