= Murders of Aidan Moffitt and Michael Snee =

2022 murders in Sligo, Ireland

- Snee (left) and Moffitt (right)
- Date: 11–12 April 2022
- Location: Sligo, Ireland
- Motive: Hostility and prejudice towards homosexual men
- Target: Aidan Moffitt; Michael Snee; Anthony Burke; Other unidentified men
- Deaths: 2
- Injuries: 1
- Convicted: Yousef Palani
- Sentence: Life imprisonment

In April 2022, Aidan Moffitt (aged 42) and Michael Snee (aged 58) were found murdered, beheaded, in their own homes in Sligo, Ireland, in the space of 24 hours. Both men were found with serious physical injuries due to a physical assault, around 1 km apart in the town.

Separate murder investigations into their deaths were conducted, with Gardaí probing links to a serial killer. On 12 April, Yousef Palani was arrested, he was charged with the murders the following day. On 23 October 2023, Palani was sentenced to life in prison for the murders and also received a 20-year sentence for assaulting a third man, who lost the sight of one eye as a result of the attack.

== Investigation ==
Aidan Moffitt, 42 years of age, was found badly mutilated at his semi-detached home in Cartron Heights estate on the northern outskirts of Sligo town at 8:30 p.m. on Monday 11 April. He was last seen socialising the night before. Originally from Ballaghaderreen, County Roscommon, he was a well-known local auctioneer and Fine Gael activist.

At approximately 10:30 p.m. the next night, Gardaí were called to an apartment at Connaughton Road in Sligo, where a second man, 58-year-old Michael Snee was discovered dead with significant physical injuries. At about 1:45 a.m., following what was described as "intense local Garda activity and inquiries", Sligo Gardaí, assisted by the Armed Support Unit, arrested a 22-year-old man on suspicion of murder. Snee was a retired healthcare worker, who had impaired vision in one eye.

Gardaí, during their investigation, examined whether there was a homophobic motive for the killings and whether they were the work of a potential serial killer, who was targeting men on dating apps. This prompted Gardaí to issue advice to the public, urging people to take necessary precautions before meeting people online.

Gardaí also investigated a link between the killings and a stabbing attack on Saturday 9 April of another man in his 40s, Anthony Burke, in Sligo town, which saw the target lose an eye. They believed that the killings may not have been the perpetrator's first attempts at violent assaults and may have searched for other victims.

== Reactions ==
On 13 April 2022, Minister for Justice Helen McEntee described the murders as "atrocious crimes" and said she wanted to reassure people and the LGBT community that any crimes motivated by hate or prejudice would not be tolerated and would carry higher sentences.

Taoiseach Micheál Martin said he was "deeply concerned" and urged anyone with any information to contact Gardaí. Tánaiste Leo Varadkar said he was "shocked" and "worried" by the two deaths.

Members of the LGBT community in Ireland said they felt "deeply distressed and concerned" following the attacks, while LGBT Ireland said it was "shocked" and "deeply saddened" by the "heinous crimes" perpetrated in Sligo and called on the Government to urgently enact hate crime laws.

Towns, villages and communities across Ireland gathered to pay tribute to the memory of Moffitt and Snee in the days after their deaths, with vigils taking place in Sligo, Dublin, Limerick, Waterford, Wexford, Galway, Belfast, Cork, Kilkenny and in counties Louth and Tipperary.

== Yousef Palani ==
=== Charges and guilty plea ===
On 14 April, a 22-year-old man, Yousef Palani, was charged with the two murders and was also charged with the assault of a third man, arising out of an incident on 9 April. That afternoon, he was brought before a special sitting of Sligo District Court and was heckled and shouted at by a large crowd who had gathered outside the courthouse. Palani was put on suicide watch by the Prison Service and was remanded in custody at Castlerea Prison to appear again at Sligo District Court on 21 April via video link. He was subsequently remanded in custody again until 12 May.

On 31 July 2023, Palani pleaded guilty to murdering the two men and intentionally causing harm to another. He was due to go on trial on 13 November, but was instead sentenced on 23 October when victim impact evidence was also heard.

=== Sentencing ===
On 23 October 2023, Palani was sentenced to life in prison for the murders and also received a 20-year sentence for assaulting a third man, who lost the sight of one eye as a result of the attack. The court heard that the attacks were motivated by hostility and prejudice towards homosexual men and that Palani had used a dating app to meet gay men who lived alone with the intention of killing them.

The court heard that the first murder victim, Aidan Moffitt, had been decapitated in his home, with his head placed on a bed. He had also suffered 42 stab wounds. Gardaí noted that his two hands were tied behind his back and a yellow bottle of bleach was left beside his head, while a knife with a serrated blade had been placed into Moffitt's right hand. The second murder victim, Michael Snee, was also found tied up on the floor of his own bedroom, while a hunting knife and a black coloured knife had been laid on the bed to make the shape of a cross. There were 38 sharp force injuries to Snee's body and he had been stabbed 25 times mainly to the head, neck, and chest.

=== Since sentencing ===
Originally sent to Mountjoy, Palani was beaten by fellow killer Stephen Penrose and three others in March 2024. He was then moved to Portlaoise. On 29 May 2024, Palani seriously assaulted a prison officer in an exercise yard in Portlaoise Prison. Such was the severity of the assault that the prison officer required hospital treatment. From this point Palani had to be "barrier-handled", with riot gear and shields used by anyone coming into contact with him.

Palani is the second eldest of an eight-child Kurdish family who came to Ireland in 2006 under a UN relocation programme which saw the family provided with accommodation by the Irish State. The house the family occupied at the time of the murders and in which Palani was arrested is owned by the GAA. Local residents were critical of the GAA for not engaging with them following allegations of intimidating behaviour by the Palani family.

In December 2024, Juma Palani (father of Yousef Palani) initiated High Court proceedings against Ireland, its Minister for Justice, Minister for Social Protection, Attorney General, Criminal Assets Bureau and Chief Appeals Officer challenging the State's decision to stop his social welfare benefits after finding that there are “reasonable grounds to infer” he engaged in criminal activity. Juma Palani is well-known among locals for running bare-chested and backwards around Sligo town, often with his wife following wearing her niqab.
