= St Michael's Church, Creeslough =

Coordinates: 55°07′24″N 7°54′38″W

St Michael's
- St Michael's Church
- St Michael's
- Location: Raphoe
- Denomination: Catholic
- Website: Web Link

Architecture
- Demolished: None

Administration
- Archdiocese: Armagh
- Diocese: Raphoe
- Parish: Dunfanaghy (Clondahorkey)/ Creeslough

Clergy
- Bishop: Niall Coll
- Priest: John Joe Duffy

St Michael's Church is a Catholic Church in Creeslough, County Donegal, Ireland. It is in the Diocese of Raphoe. The current building was built in the early 1970's to replace a previous church building in the townland of Cashelmore which dated from the late 18th century, which today lies in ruins in the local graveyard, which remained in Cashelmore. It has baptismal and marriage records dating back to 1877 and has held the death register since 1913. The cemetery at Doe dates from 1843.. John Joe Duffy is the parish priest currently.

Following the Creeslough explosion, which killed ten people on 7 October 2022, the funerals of many of the victims were held inside the church. President Higgins was in attendance, after flying back especially from an important meeting abroad.
