= Richard Sinnott (academic) =

Irish academic and political commentator (1947–2022)

- Born: Richard Sinnott; 30 June 1947; Wexford, County Wexford, Leinster, Ireland
- Died: 3 January 2022 (aged 74); Dublin, County Dublin, Leinster, Ireland
- Education: University College Dublin, Georgetown University
- Occupations: Academic, political commentator
- Years active: 1976–2012
- Spouse(s): Margaret Murray (m. 1971)
- Children: 2

Richard Sinnott (30 June 1947 – 3 January 2022) was an Irish academic, political commentator and broadcaster.

== Career ==
Initially attracted to a life in the priesthood, Sinnott enrolled as a student at University College Dublin in 1968, graduating in 1971 with an honours degree in history and politics. He went on to acquire a master's degree in politics under the tutelage of Brian Farrell. Sinnott spent two years from 1972 to 1974 at Georgetown University, undergoing preparatory coursework which later led to a PhD that was awarded in 1983. On his return from Washington, he initially held a research fellowship at the Economic and Social Research Institute in Dublin. Appointed an assistant lecturer in politics at UCD in 1976, Sinnott was later promoted to full lecturer and went on to become an associate professor and eventually full professor of political science. He made regular appearances on RTÉ as an election pundit and was elected a member of the Royal Irish Academy in 2012.

== Personal life and death ==
Sinnott was born in Wexford in June 1947. His father, also named Richard, was a pharmacist and his mother, Peggy, was a nurse. Sinnott married Margaret Murray in December 1971. He died after a long illness on 3 January 2022, at the age of 74.
