= Donal O'Keeffe =

Irish Gaelic footballer (1963–2022)

Personal information
- Native name: Dónall Ó Caoimh (Irish)
- Born: 1963 Clonmel, County Tipperary, Ireland
- Died: 2 September 2022 (aged 59) Wexford, Ireland
- Occupation: Bank official

Sport
- Sport: Gaelic football
- Position: Centre-back
Club
- Years: Club
- Clonmel Commercials
Club titles
- Tipperary titles: 5
Inter-county
- Years: County
- 1984-1990: Tipperary
Inter-county titles
- Munster titles: 0
- All-Irelands: 0
- NFL: 0
- All Stars: 0

Donal O'Keeffe (1963 - 2 September 2022) was an Irish Gaelic footballer. At club level he played with Clonmel Commercials and was also a member of the Tipperary senior football team.

== Career ==
O'Keeffe first played Gaelic football at juvenile and underage levels with the Clonmel Commercials club. He won a Tipperary MFC title in 1981 before later winning consecutive Tipperary U21FC titles in 1983 and 1984. By this stage O'Keeffe had joined the club's senior team and he won five Tipperary SFC titles during a golden age for the club.

O'Keeffe first appeared on the inter-county scene as a member of the Tipperary minor football team in 1981. He later lined out for one season with the under-21 team. O'Keeffe was drafted onto the senior team in 1984. He lined out at various times over the following number of years and captained the team in 1990.

== Death ==
O'Keeffe died at Wexford General Hospital on 2 September 2022, aged 59. Two days earlier he was involved in a "freak accident" while cycling on the N25 outside Wexford.

== Honours ==
Clonmel Commercials

- Tipperary Senior Football Championship: 1982, 1986, 1989, 1990, 1994
- South Tipperary Senior Football Championship: 1982, 1986, 1989, 1990, 1994
- Tipperary Under-21 Football Championship: 1983, 1984
- Tipperary Minor Football Championship: 1981

Sporting positions
Preceded by Brian Burke	Tipperary senior football team captain 1990	Succeeded by Philly Ryan
