= Murder of Valerie French =

2019 murder in Ireland

Valerie French
- Died: 13 June 2019
- Cause of death: Stab wounds, strangulation, blunt force trauma
- Resting place: Cathedral Church of St. Fachtna in Rosscarbery, Co. Cork
- Known for: Murder victim

Valerie French was an Irish woman who was murdered by her husband, James Kilroy, in June 2019.

== Attack on Valerie French ==
On 13 June 2019 between 11 pm and midnight, Valerie French (41), was assaulted and killed at her house in Kilbree Lower, outside Castlebar in Co. Mayo. Her husband James Kilroy was arrested and charged with her murder.

== Trials ==
James Kilroy pleaded not guilty by reason of insanity. Following the collapse of two trials in 2023 a third trial held in July 2024 convicted James Kilroy of murder.

Justice Tony Hunt said that the defence of not guilty by reason of insanity was clearly not applicable as the diagnosis of cannabis-induced psychotic disorder being used clearly came under "intoxicating influence" as mentioned in the relevant legislation.

== Background ==
French, originally from Leap, County Cork, was a senior occupational therapist working in Castlebar, Co. Mayo, Ireland.

Valerie's mother, Valerie French (née Pyburn) died five months later in November 2019 as a result of a stroke which her family believe was brought on by the enormous stress and uncertainty following the murder of her daughter. Mrs French had said to her family that “my life is ruined” after the loss of her daughter and in concern about the future of her three young grandchildren.

James Kilroy is believed to be originally from Oldcastle, County Meath. He was employed as a park ranger with the National Parks and Wildlife Service (Ireland) (NPWS) and had been working in Wild Nephin National Park.

== Legacy ==
The victim's brother David French has called for a change in the law to strip child guardianship from people convicted of killing partners with whom they share children. The argument for a change in the law was also made in the Irish Times.

Speaking outside the Criminal Courts of Justice, Dublin after the verdict French stated that "Valerie's husband killed her brutally yet he retains all his parental rights to her children. This is an absolutely ridiculous situation. Killing a mother is child abuse. Children have to be protected from abusers. Murderers in the UK have their parental rights suspended under what is called Jade's Law. This loophole needs to be closed to protect the children who are put in this hellish situation every year."

The verdict and subsequent call for law reform received very significant media coverage.

Holly Cairns TD, Leader of the Social Democrats, started preparing a Bill to suspend parental rights of those convicted of domestic homicide.

The situation has drawn comparisons to the Murder of Jennifer Poole by her ex-partner where her brother Jason also called for law reform.

During a Dail debate on gender based violence brought forward by Ruth Coppinger TD on February 26th, 2025, Justice Minister Jim O'Callaghan announced that a memorandum will go to Government in March seeking an amendment to the Guardianship of Infants Act to implement “Valerie’s Law”, which would remove guardianship rights from people who killed their spouse.

The background of Valerie's life, her relationship with her husband, the crime and the aftermath are covered in a book called For Valerie written by her brother David and published by Gill Books in May 2025.
