= Eoin Farrell =

Irish Gaelic footballer (1982–2022)

Personal information
- Native name: Eoin Ó Fearail (Irish)
- Nickname: Eoinie
- Born: November 1982 Athlone, County Westmeath, Ireland
- Died: 3 July 2022 (aged 39) Athlone, County Westmeath, Ireland
- Occupation: Accountant

Sport
- Sport: Gaelic football
- Position: Goalkeeper
Club
- Years: Club
- Maryland
Club titles
- Westmeath titles: 0
College
- Years: College
- 2000–2006: Athlone Institute of Technology
College titles
- Sigerson titles: 0
Inter-county
- Years: County
- Westmeath
Inter-county titles
- Leinster titles: 0
- All-Irelands: 0
- NFL: 0
- All Stars: 0

Eoin Farrell (Irish: Eoin Ó Fearail; November 1982 – 3 July 2022) was an Irish Gaelic footballer and selector. At club level he played with Maryland and was also a member of the Westmeath senior football team. Farrell usually lined out as a goalkeeper.

== Career ==
Farrell first played Gaelic football at juvenile and underage levels with the Maryland club. He also lined out as a schoolboy with the Marist College in Athlone and was a goalkeeper on the team that lost the 1999 Leinster colleges final to Good Counsel College. Farrell first appeared on the inter-county scene as a member of the Westmeath minor football team that beat Dublin to win the 1999 Leinster MFC title. He later lined out at under-21 and senior levels and also played with Athlone Institute of Technology in the Sigerson Cup. Farrell won a Westmeath IFC title with Maryland in 2008. He later served as a selector with the Westmeath minor football team.

== Death ==
Farrell died after a short illness on 3 July 2022, aged 40.

== Honours ==
Maryland

- Westmeath Intermediate Football Championship: 2008

Westmeath

- Leinster Minor Football Championship: 2000
