= Murder of Jennifer Poole =

2021 murder in Ireland

Jennifer Poole
- Died: 17 April 2021
- Cause of death: Multiple stab wounds
- Resting place: Glasnevin Cemetery
- Known for: Murder victim

Jennifer Poole was an Irish woman who was murdered by her ex-partner, Gavin Murphy, in April 2021.

== Attack on Poole ==
On 17 April 2021 at around 2 pm, Jennifer Poole (24), was stabbed to death at her first-floor apartment in Melville Drive, Finglas, north Dublin.

Neighbours raised the alarm and emergency services attended the scene before she was rushed to Connolly Hospital where she died a short time later. Her cause of death was haemorrhage and shock due to multiple stab wounds.

== Trial ==
Prior to sentencing with the mandatory life sentence for murder, the Court heard that Murphy had 13 previous convictions for the use of a mobile phone whilst in custody, the unlawful seizure of a vehicle, criminal damage, burglary, the production of an article in the course of a dispute and two counts of assault causing harm. It was in Court that Poole's family learned for the first time that Murphy, from Ballymun, had a history of violence against women and had previously been jailed for two years for attacking a former partner and her mother with a knife in 2015.

Justice Paul Burns said it was "yet another case of a violent attack upon a young woman" by a male partner with fatal consequences.

== Background ==
Poole, originally from the Ballygall area of Finglas, was a healthcare worker at Beneavin Lodge Care Home, and played camogie with local club Erin's Isle. Murphy was in a relationship with Poole less than a year before he killed her. They met in May 2020 and he moved in to her home in Melville Drive in Finglas. In April 2021 the relationship was over.

== Legacy ==
The victim's brother Jason Poole has called for better laws to stop violence against women. Speaking at a vigil in Ballymun, County Dublin following the murder of Ashling Murphy Poole called for stronger laws to penalise those who attack women and for better education for the upcoming generation saying "We call on Government to sit with interested bodies and strengthen the current legislation and enact new legislation to keep women safe....we hear about new legislation on the way. Let's just hope that this legislation protects the women of Ireland so no new families have to suffer like the 244 families who will always be suffering the loss of their family member. Parents and guardians need to sit down with their children and tell them that it is not okay to use violence.".

Speaking outside the Criminal Courts of Justice, Dublin after the verdict Poole stated that "Domestic violence in Ireland has become far too common, and it is not OK," adding "We as a family call on all women and men that find themselves in situations where domestic violence is part of their lives to please seek help and support." He urged people to speak to gardaí or contact relevant organisations. Jason Poole has also called for implementation of a domestic violence register in Ireland similar to the Domestic Violence Disclosure Scheme often known as "Clare's Law" in the United Kingdom.

On 22 June 2022 Jason Poole spoke on the Claire Byrne show along with Jim O'Callaghan, Fianna Fáil TD for Dublin Bay South and party spokesman for Justice to discuss a Bill to tackle violence against women. He stated "I believe that if that law was here then I would have been able to walk into a Garda station and know her killer had done something like this before and be able to warn her".

The situation has drawn comparisons to the Murder of Valerie French by her husband where her brother David also called for law reform.
