= Michael O'Connor (centenarian) =

Irish centenarian (1913-2022)

- Born: Michael John O'Connor; 13 October 1913; Glencar, County Kerry, Ireland
- Died: 21 August 2022 (aged 108 years, 312 days); Kenmare, County Kerry, Ireland
- Known for: Believed to be Ireland's oldest man at the time of his death
- Spouse: Joan McTernan (m. 1949; died 2008)
- Children: 5

Michael John O'Connor (13 October 1913 – 21 August 2022) was an Irish centenarian. At the time of his death he was believed to be Ireland's oldest man.

== Biography ==
O'Connor was born in Glencar, County Kerry in October 1913. His parents both worked as teachers in the area. At the age of six, O'Connor and his mother contracted Spanish flu, an illness which his mother eventually succumbed to. He left Ireland as a young man, joined the Merchant Navy and worked as a radio operator during World War II. In 1942, O'Connor's ship was torpedoed by a German U-boat, but he survived the sinking. He also survived the Japanese raid of the Bay of Bengal. O'Connor settled in County Clare after returning to Ireland and worked with the Irish Aviation Authority until his retirement in 1980.

== Personal life and death ==
O'Connor married Joan McTernan in Limerick in 1949 and together they had five children. After his retirement the couple settled in Muckross, County Kerry. O'Connor was predeceased by his wife in April 2008.

O'Connor died in Kenmare on 21 August 2022, aged 108. At the time of his death he was believed the oldest man in Ireland.
