= Seán Garvey =

Irish traditional singer (1952–2022)

Seán Garvey (28 June 1952 – 6 May 2022) was an Irish traditional singer from Cahersiveen, County Kerry. In 2006, he was the TG4 Traditional Singer of the Year, considered "the most prestigious traditional music award" in Ireland.

Garvey first rose to prominence as a singer and musician in Dublin in the early 1970s. He co-founded the Islandbridge Singers' Club and later joined the Góilín Singers' Club. He became a key figure in the city's expanding Irish traditional music and folk-club scene, centered at the time in venues such as O'Donoghue's Pub on Merrion Row, Slatterys on Capel Street, and, later on, The Cobblestone in Smithfield.

== Albums ==
- Ón dTalamh Amach (1998)
- The Bonny Bunch of Roses (2003)
