= 1980 All-Ireland Under-21 Hurling Championship final =

1980 All-Ireland Under-21 Hurling Championship Final
- Event: 1980 All-Ireland Under-21 Hurling Championship
Tipperary	Kilkenny
2-9	0-14
- Date: 14 September 1980
- Venue: Walsh Park, Waterford
- Referee: John Denton (Wexford)

The 1980 All-Ireland Under-21 Hurling Championship final was a hurling match that was played at Walsh Park, Waterford on 14 September 1980 to determine the winners of the 1980 All-Ireland Under-21 Hurling Championship, the 17th season of the All-Ireland Under-21 Hurling Championship, a tournament organised by the Gaelic Athletic Association for the champion teams of the four provinces of Ireland. The final was contested by Tipperary of Munster and Kilkenny of Leinster, with Tipperary winning by 2-9 to 0-14.

== Match ==
=== Details ===
14 September 1980

Tipperary	2-9 – 0-14	Kilkenny
M Murphy 1-1, A Buckley 1-0, J Kennedy 0-3, P Power 0-3, P McGrath 0-2.		B Purcell 0-4, M Nash 0-4, B McEvoy 0-3, L Ryan 0-1, J Mulcahy 0-1, E Wallace 0-1.

Walsh Park, Waterford
Referee: J Denton (Waterford)
