= Val Joyce =

Irish radio presenter (1931–2022)

- Born: Valentine J. Joyce; 14 February 1931; Rathgar, Dublin, Ireland
- Died: 8 October 2022 (aged 91); Blackrock, Dublin, Ireland
- Resting place: Kilternan Cemetery Park
- Education: St Mary's College; University College Dublin
- Occupation: Broadcaster
- Years active: 1956-2006
- Employer: Raidió Teilifís Éireann (RTÉ)
- Notable work: Airs and Graces; Sound of Light; Pop Call; Late Date
- Spouse: Vera Morgan
- Children: 5

Valentine J. Joyce (14 February 1931 – 8 October 2022) was an Irish radio broadcaster who was active on Raidió Teilifís Éireann (RTE).

== Early life ==
Joyce was born on 14 February 1931. He was educated at St Mary's College in Rathmines, before completing a BComm at University College Dublin. His first job was as a clerk with a shipping company.

== Career ==
Joyce worked with the Irish Hospitals' Sweepstake as an accountant before his radio career began in the 1950s when a number of sponsored programmes were broadcast on Radio Éireann. One of those sponsored slots was taken by the Irish Hospitals' Sweepstake and Joyce was chosen as presenter. When Telefís Éireann began he voiced a number of television commercials. He also presented Sound of the Light, the broadcasts of the Radio Éireann Light Orchestra, and started the programme Pop Call in the 1960s, the first ever phone-in pop request programme.

Joyce was best-known for Airs and Races, which ran on Saturday afternoons between 1974 and 1991 and featured songs as well as sporting events, including horseracing. He also presented Ireland's Choice with Val Joyce and then, for over 15 years, Late Date until the programme was axed in 2006.

== Personal life and death ==
Joyce met dancer and singer Vera Morgan at a party following the opening night of Telefís Éireann in 1961. They became engaged after attending the second ever recording of The Late Late Show in July 1962 and were married soon after. The couple had five children. Vera Joyce predeceased her husband in October 2016.

Joyce died at Ferndene nursing home in Blackrock on 8 October 2022, at the age of 91.
