= Pauline Bewick =

English-born Irish artist (1935–2022)

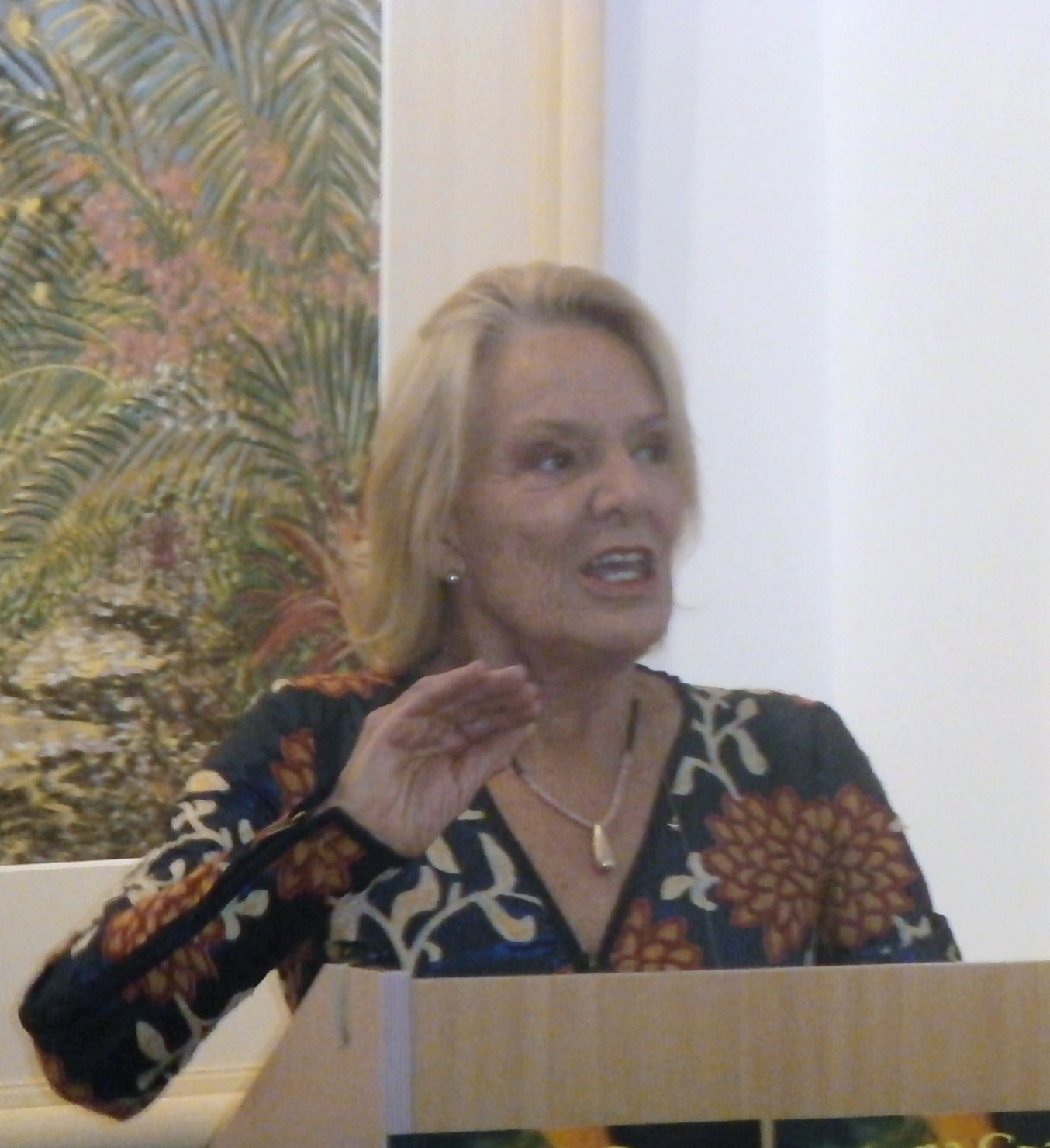
- Born: 4 September 1935; Northumberland, England
- Died: 28 July 2022 (aged 86)
- Education: National College of Art and Design
- Known for: Artist, oil painter

Pauline Bewick (4 September 1935 – 28 July 2022) was an English-born Irish artist.

Bewick was born in Northumberland, England on 4 September 1935, and with her mother Alice ('Harry') and sister Hazel, moved many times between England and Ireland, before finally settling in County Kerry where she lived and worked, near Caragh Lake. She claimed to be distantly related to actress Meryl Streep, through her mother. She was a descendant of 19th-century artist Thomas Bewick.

In her teens, Bewick started studying at the National College of Art and Design in Dublin, and after graduation, moved to London. During her time there she illustrated a children's animated television series for the BBC and also produced illustrations for books and magazines. On her return to Dublin she took jobs in singing and acting, and in 1957 opened her first exhibition there.

Pauline met future husband Pat Melia while studying in Dublin in the early 1960's and subsequently married in 1963. The couple would go on to raise two daughters, Poppy and Holly. In 2015, at the age of 84, her husband contracted Alzheimer's disease, and peacefully passed on 4th September 2016.

A prolific artist, Bewick painted in oil, sculpted, and worked with cloth, but was most associated with watercolours. For the last decade or so she had been working on her Yellow Man project, a large collection of works featuring a cartoon-like yellow horned figure. In 2006 she donated a collection of 200 works including tapestries, wall hangings, watercolours and sketches to the state, now on permanent display in the Walton Building at the Waterford Institute of Technology, and in the Killorglin Library, County Kerry.

During Bewick's career she illustrated several books and published several books of prints of her paintings. In 2015, at 80 years of age, she published her memoir "80: A Memoir".

Pauline Bewick died of cancer on 28 July 2022, at the age of 86.
