= Jacqueline Stanley =

British and Irish artist (1928–2022)

- Born: 1928; Camberwell, London, England
- Died: 12 December 2022 (aged 93–94); Cooden, Sussex, England
- Education: Beckenham College of Art; Royal College of Art (1949–1952)
- Spouse: Campbell Bruce
- Website: jacquelinestanley.com

Jacqueline Stanley, HRHA, ARCA (1928–2022) was a British and Irish painter and printmaker.

== Biography ==
Stanley was born in London in 1928.

Stanley studied at Beckenham College of Art and the Royal College of Art, London (1949–1952). Her fellow RCA students included Edward Middleditch, Jack Smith, John Bratby and Sheila Robinson. She was tutored by John Minton, Ruskin Spear, Carel Weight and Francis Bacon, who gave her her first glass of champagne.

In 1975, she moved to Ireland and taught at the National College of Art and Design in Dublin until 1990.

Stanley was married to Campbell Bruce (1927–2014). Both Bruce and Stanley were well known artists in Ireland in the 1970s and 1980s. Stanley was also an art teacher and taught Ian Dury.

Stanley exhibited widely and much of her work is in major public and private collections.

Stanley died in Cooden, Sussex, on 12 December 2022, at the age of 94.
