= Liam Cahill (journalist) =

Irish journalist (1950–2022)

- Born: 7 May 1950; Waterford, Ireland
- Died: 20 June 2022 (aged 72); Drumree, County Meath, Ireland
- Resting place: Culmullen Cemetery
- Education: Mount Sion CBS Secondary School
- Alma mater: University College Dublin (BCL)
- Occupations: Civil servant; journalist; political adviser; historian
- Spouse: Patricia Cannon (m. 1977; died 2015)
- Children: 2

Liam Cahill (7 May 1950 – 20 June 2022) was an Irish civil servant, journalist, political adviser and historian.

== Career ==
Cahill took up a position as a civil servant in January 1972, working in the capital taxes branch of the Revenue Commissioners for five years. In 1977, he was promoted to administrative officer and transferred to the EEC and Law Reform Division of the Department of Justice. In December 1979 Cahill joined RTÉ, where his initial title was industrial reporter. Three years later he was appointed economics correspondent, a position he held for six years before becoming political correspondent, working mainly from Leinster House. In January 1990 Cahill took a break from RTÉ to work in a temporary position as press spokesperson during Ireland's presidency of the European Council. After leaving RTÉ completely in December 1990 he spent much of the next 30 years working as an adviser and consultant to various groups, including Allied Irish Bank and Intel Ireland. He also served as a political adviser to David Andrews, Shane McEntee, Nessa Childers, Thomas Byrne and Alan Kelly. Cahill's first book, Forgotten Revolution: The Limerick Soviet 1919, was published in 1990 and a follow-up was released in 2019. His last book, From Suir to Jarama, Mossie Quinlan's Life and Legacy, was published in 2021.

== Personal life and death ==
Born in Waterford in May 1950, Cahill was educated at the city's Mount Sion school. He later studied part-time at University College Dublin, acquiring the degree of Bachelor of Civil Law. Cahill married Patricia Cannon in 1977. He died suddenly on 20 June 2022, aged 72.
