= Ryves =

Ryves is a surname, and may refer to:

- Bruno Ryves (1596–1677), English royalist churchman
- Elizabeth Ryves (1750–1797), Irish author
- George Ryves, English academic
- George Frederick Ryves, Royal Navy admiral
- George Ryves (MP) (1627–1689), English politician
- John Ryves (1593–1665), English Archdeacon
- John Ryves (MP) (1567–1634), English politician
- Lavinia Ryves (1797–1871), British claimant
- P.M. Ryves, English astronomer who discovered the Ryves Comet
- Richard Ryves (1643-1693), Irish judge
- Thomas Ryves (c.1583-1652), English civil lawyer
- William Ryves (c.1570-1648), English lawyer

== See also ==
- Ryves Holt (1696–1763), Chief Justice of the Delaware Supreme Court
- Margracia Loudon, née Ryves (c.1788–1860), Irish novelist and political author
