= Timeline of the COVID-19 pandemic in the Republic of Ireland (2022) =

Daily events related to the COVID-19 pandemic in the Republic of Ireland in 2022

The following is a timeline of the COVID-19 pandemic in the Republic of Ireland in 2022.

== Timeline ==
=== January 2022 ===
- 1 January
  - A further 23,281 cases were reported, bringing the total number of confirmed cases to 811,840.
  - Health officials warned that the true number of cases was likely to be higher, due to increased pressure on the PCR testing system.
- 3 January – Vaccine registration began for all children aged 5 to 11.
- 4 January – Minister for Education Norma Foley confirmed that schools would reopen as planned on 6 January, despite rising COVID-19 cases.
- 5 January – A further 17,656 cases and 40 deaths were reported, bringing the totals to 884,855 cases and 5,952 deaths.
- 6 January
  - A further 23,817 cases were reported, bringing the total number of confirmed cases to 908,672.
  - People who received a third or booster vaccine dose began receiving an updated Digital COVID Certificate.
- 8 January – A further 26,122 cases (the highest number of confirmed cases recorded in a single day since the pandemic began) were reported, bringing the total number of confirmed cases to 956,720.
- 10 January – A further 23,909 cases were reported, bringing the total number of confirmed cases to 1,002,013.
- 11 January – Chief Medical Officer Tony Holohan estimated that up to 500,000 people (10% of Irish population) contracted COVID-19 in the previous week.
- 12 January
  - A further 20,909 cases and 83 deaths were reported, bringing the totals to 1,042,212 cases and 6,035 deaths.
  - The Government approved changes to isolation periods for close contacts and those who test positive for COVID-19, which would take effect from 14 January.
- 15 January – Positive antigen tests started to be reported, after the HSE launched a new website to log positive antigen tests.
- 19 January
  - A further 6,843 PCR-confirmed cases and 5,295 positive antigen tests, along with 52 deaths were reported, bringing the totals to 1,122,428 cases and 6,087 deaths.
  - The Government agreed a plan to give frontline healthcare workers a once-off €1,000 tax free payment for their work during the pandemic and also agreed on an extra public holiday on 18 March in remembrance of people who died due to COVID-19.
- 21 January – Taoiseach Micheál Martin announced the easing of almost all COVID-19 restrictions from 6am on 22 January, with the requirements of vaccine certificates and social distancing to end, restrictions on household visits and capacity limits for indoor and outdoor events to end, nightclubs to reopen and pubs and restaurants to resume normal trading times, while rules on isolation and the wearing of masks would remain.
- 26 January – A further 5,605 PCR-confirmed cases and 4,809 positive antigen tests, along with 49 deaths were reported, bringing the totals to 1,159,271 cases and 6,136 deaths.
- 28 January – The Department of Health confirmed that daily COVID-19 figures would no longer be released at weekends.
- 29 January – The Novavax vaccine was approved for use as Ireland's fifth COVID-19 vaccine.

=== February 2022 ===
- 1 February – Minister for Education Norma Foley confirmed that the 2022 Leaving Certificate would be held with no accredited grades, while the Junior Cycle exam would be held for the first time since 2019.
- 12 February – Taoiseach Micheál Martin said he believed face masks should continue to be worn even if the National Public Health Emergency Team (NPHET) recommended they no longer needed to be mandatory.
- 17 February – The National Public Health Emergency Team (NPHET) recommended that the requirement to wear masks in most areas, where currently regulated, should end, while Chief Medical Officer Tony Holohan proposed that the NPHET be disbanded and replaced with a smaller monitoring group.
- 21 February – Minister for Health Stephen Donnelly accepted recommendations from NIAC that booster vaccines be offered to children aged 12 to 15 years.
- 22 February – The Government agreed to end almost all remaining COVID-19 restrictions from 28 February, with mask wearing in schools, indoor retail settings and on public transport to be voluntary, restrictions in schools to end and testing to be scaled back.
- 28 February – The Department of Health had confirmed 1,300,422 cases and 6,497 deaths by the end of February.

=== March 2022 ===
- 4 March – President Michael D. Higgins and his wife Sabina tested positive for COVID-19.
- 5 March – Minister for Health Stephen Donnelly announced that the requirement for vaccination certificates and passenger locator forms for those arriving into Ireland would end from midnight, to make it easier for Ukrainian refugees to enter the country.
- 8 March
  - Latest figures showed that the number of people with COVID-19 in hospitals rose by over 30% in the last week, with Minister for Health Stephen Donnelly saying the numbers were creating a "very heavy burden" on hospitals.
  - Bereaved families of healthcare workers could now receive compensation.
- 17 March
  - Celebrations took place across the country to mark St Patrick's Day, following a two-year absence due to COVID-19, with around 400,000 people attending festivities in Dublin.
  - Taoiseach Micheál Martin tested positive for COVID-19 while in Washington for St Patrick's Day celebrations.
- 20 March – Events were held across the country to mark a national day of remembrance and reflection in honour of the more than 6,600 people who died from COVID-19.
- 21 March – Ireland entered a new wave of the Omicron variant, as latest figures showed that 63,954 people had tested positive for COVID-19 since St Patrick's Day, while hospitalisations were at its highest level in nearly a year at 1,308.
- 22 March – The World Health Organization said Ireland was among some countries that eased restrictions too "brutally" and were now seeing a spike in cases as a result.
- 23 March – Minister for Justice Helen McEntee tested positive for COVID-19, while Minister for Health Stephen Donnelly began self-isolating at home due to flu-like symptoms.
- 25 March
  - Tánaiste Leo Varadkar cancelled a number of engagements in Cork and began self-isolating after testing positive for COVID-19.
  - Dr Tony Holohan announced that he would step down as Chief Medical Officer on 1 July, following his appointment as Professor of Public Health Strategy and Leadership at Trinity College Dublin.
- 27 March – Latest figures showed that there were 1,569 patients in hospitals with COVID-19, the highest figure in 14 months.
- 29 March – Minister for Health Stephen Donnelly said there were no plans for restrictions to be re-introduced, despite the number of COVID-19 cases likely to be "hundreds of thousands" per week, while he said the BA.2 variant now accounted for about 95% of cases in Ireland.
- 31 March – The Health (Preservation and Protection and other Emergency Measures in the Public Interest) Act 2020 expired at midnight.

=== April 2022 ===
- 4 April – The HSE announced that their Chief Operations Officer Anne O'Connor would be leaving the organisation in the summer to take up a new role as Managing Director of VHI Health and Wellbeing.
- 6 April – The National Immunisation Advisory Committee (NIAC) recommended a fourth COVID-19 vaccine dose for everyone aged 65 and older, and for those aged 12 and older who are immunocompromised.
- 8 April
  - Minister for Health Stephen Donnelly announced the establishment of a new COVID-19 advisory group, replacing the National Public Health Emergency Team.
  - The Health Protection Surveillance Centre said that COVID-19 case numbers in Ireland were decreasing but remained high.
- 9 April – Chief Medical Officer Tony Holohan announced that he would retire on 1 July and would not take up a planned academic position at Trinity College Dublin, following several days of controversy.
- 14 April – The Department of Health advised people to continue to follow public health advice over the Easter bank holiday weekend.
- 16 April – COVID-19 hospital and ICU numbers continued to decrease to its lowest levels since 5 March. Cases also continued to decline sharply.
- 23 April – The first full-capacity concert at Croke Park since the COVID-19 pandemic took place, with Ed Sheeran kicking off his world tour singing for over 80,000 fans.
- 26 April – The number of people who died with COVID-19 in Ireland surpassed 7,000, while hospitalisations reached their lowest level since December 2021.
- 27 April – The World Health Organization said there would be surges in COVID-19 cases every three months, with Ireland expected to see another surge in four to six weeks.
- 29 April – The Department of Health announced that updates on the number of new COVID-19 cases in Ireland would no longer be published daily.

=== May 2022 ===
- 10 May – The Department of Health announced that Deputy Chief Medical Officer Dr Ronan Glynn would resign at the end of the month to take up a role with consultancy firm EY.
- 22 May – According to the latest weekly COVID-19 report from Chief Medical Officer Tony Holohan, two cases of the BA.4 sub-variant of Omicron were confirmed in Ireland during the week of 7 May.

=== June 2022 ===
- 10 June
  - Minister for Health Stephen Donnelly said his department was watching closely a recent rise in COVID-19 hospitalisations and urged people to take up their booster vaccine.
  - Tánaiste Leo Varadkar warned of a potential summer wave of COVID-19.
- 12 June – COVID-19 hospitalisations continued to increase with warnings from Ireland's leading medical professionals that a summer wave was likely to be on the way.
- 15 June – Professor Breda Smyth was appointed interim Chief Medical Officer at the Department of Health from 4 July, pending the completion of an open competition to fill the role on a permanent basis, after incumbent Dr Tony Holohan announced that he would resign on 1 July.
- 20 June – Latest figures showed that there were 606 patients in hospital with COVID-19, an increase of 153 from the previous week. HSE Chief Clinical Officer Dr Colm Henry said he was "very concerned", while a virologist at UCD said it was too late to reintroduce mandatory mask wearing, adding that the latest wave of infection had been "completely predictable".
- 27 June – Paul Reid announced that he would be stepping down from his position as Director-General of the Health Service Executive at the end of the year "to spend time with his family".
- 28 June – It was reported that early work was under way on new legislation which would allow the Government to make mask-wearing mandatory again in certain settings as a precautionary measure in the event of the COVID-19 situation worsening in the winter.
- 29 June – The Health Service Executive (HSE) had confirmed 1,600,614 cases and 7,499 deaths by the end of June.

=== July 2022 ===
- 1 July
  - More than 800 people were in hospital with COVID-19 for the first time since April.
  - Dr Tony Holohan retired from his role as the Ireland's Chief Medical Officer after 14 years in the job.
- 5 July – Interim Chief Medical Officer Professor Breda Smyth said Ireland was currently experiencing a surge in COVID-19 cases and urged the older population to avail of a second booster, describing the COVID-19 situation as being one of mitigation and not containment.
- 11 July – More than 1,000 people were in hospital with COVID-19 for the first time since April.
- 23 July – Minister for Health Stephen Donnelly accepted new recommendations from the National Immunisation Advisory Committee over Ireland's autumn COVID-19 vaccination programme, which would see a first, second or third booster vaccine given to certain age groups.
- 27 July – A recommendation from Interim Chief Medical Officer Professor Breda Smyth that all Health Service Executive COVID-19 testing facilities be stood down from the autumn and to end free COVID-19 tests was accepted by Government.

=== October 2022 ===
- 3 October – The HSE launched its winter vaccination programme offering the annual flu vaccine and new COVID-19 booster vaccines, which protect against the Omicron variant.
- 5 October – It was announced that Professor Breda Smyth would take over as full time Chief Medical Officer, having previously held the position on an interim basis.
- 11 October – Minister for Health Stephen Donnelly presented the Government with an emergency response plan to ensure Ireland could appropriately deal with a new COVID-19 variant of concern, saying that there had been a "significant" increase in the number of hospitalisations over the previous week.

=== December 2022 ===
- 20 December – Chief Medical Officer Breda Smyth appealed to people with flu-like symptoms to stay at home and to return to wearing masks on public transport, saying she was "very worried" about a recent surge in COVID-19 ahead of increased socialising over the Christmas period.
- 21 December – The HSE's Chief Clinical Officer Dr Colm Henry urged people to wear masks on public transport and busy settings, as the number of recorded COVID-19 infections rose, saying that cases were up 75% in one week, while hospitalisations were up 90% since the beginning of December.
- 29 December – The HSE announced that people aged 18 to 49 would be offered their second booster dose and a first vaccine for infants and children aged six months to four years was also authorised amid concerns about a rise in cases of COVID-19, influenza and other respiratory illness.
- 31 December – The Health Service Executive (HSE) had confirmed 1,690,492 cases and 8,293 deaths by the end of 2022.
