= John Stearne =

John Stearne may refer to:

- John Stearne (physician), Irish physician and educator
- John Stearne (witch-hunter), English witch-hunter
- John Sterne (bishop of Dromore) (1660–1745), also called John Stearne, Bishop of Dromore from 1713 until 1717, and then Bishop of Clogher

== See also ==
- John Sterne (disambiguation)
- Stern John, Trinidadian football manager and footballer
- John Stearns (disambiguation)
