= Faculty of Occupational Medicine =

Faculty of Occupational Medicine may refer to:

- Faculty of Occupational Medicine (Ireland), a division of the Royal College of Physicians of Ireland
- Faculty of Occupational Medicine (United Kingdom)
