= John Sterne =

John Sterne may refer to:

- John Sterne (bishop of Colchester) (died 1607), bishop of Colchester
- John Sterne (bishop of Dromore) (1660–1745), Irish churchman, bishop of Dromore, then bishop of Clogher

== See also ==
- John Stearne (disambiguation)
