= Richard Ryves =

Irish judge (1643–1693)

Sir Richard Ryves (1643–1693) was a seventeenth-century Irish judge who served for several years as Recorder of Dublin, and subsequently as a Baron of the Exchequer. He was briefly a Commissioner of the Great Seal.

== Background ==
He was born in Dublin, eldest son of Charles Ryves, examiner of the Court of Chancery (Ireland), who died in 1675, and his wife Jane Ogden. He was a grandson of Sir William Ryves, judge of the Court of King's Bench (Ireland) 1636-1648, by his first wife, of whom little is known. The Ryves family were originally from Damory in Dorset, and Sir William later held lands in County Wicklow, County Kilkenny and County Carlow, most of which he lost in the Irish Rebellion of 1641. Richard however prided himself on being "a true-born Dubliner". He had one brother, Jerome Ryves, Dean of St Patrick's Cathedral, Dublin, and one sister Dorothy, who married the eminent physician John Stearne, founder of the Irish College of Physicians, and was the mother of John Stearne, Bishop of Clogher.

John Stearne, founder of the Irish College of Physicians, who married Richard's sister Dorothy

In 1673 he married Mary Savage, daughter of Valentine Savage of Dublin and his wife Anne Haughton, and sister of Philip Savage, Chancellor of the Exchequer of Ireland, and had issue. He lived first at St. Michael's Lane, then at Little Green, adjacent to Capel Street, where his colleague Sir Standish Hartstonge, 1st Baronet was a neighbour.

== Career ==
Ryves graduated from Trinity College, Dublin. He was called to the English Bar and then in 1669 returned to practice law in Ireland. He enjoyed the patronage of the Duke of Ormonde, through whom he obtained the position of Recorder of Kilkenny in 1671. He was also Chief Prothonotary (clerk) of the Court of King's Bench (Ireland), jointly with his brother-in-law Philip Savage. In 1680 the office of Recorder of Dublin became vacant; Ryves who prided himself on being a "town-born child" (i.e. a true Dubliner) applied for and obtained it. He was admitted to the Middle Temple ("called of grace") in 1669.

In 1682 Sir Richard Stephens was dismissed from his office as Second Serjeant, on the grounds of being a nonconformist in religion. Ryves, who claimed to be the most senior King's counsel, expected to be appointed to the office and was bitterly disappointed to be passed over in favour of a rather obscure barrister called William Beckett. He was soon compensated with the office of Third Serjeant. This office was a very recent innovation, which had been created especially for Sir John Lyndon, who had been similarly disappointed in his hopes of becoming either Second Serjeant or a High Court judge. Ryves was promoted to Second Serjeant later in 1683. He combined the offices of Serjeant and Recorder, despite the fact that the latter office had a notoriously heavy workload, which may have contributed to the breakdown of his health. He was replaced as Recorder by Garrett Dillon in 1685.

As a Whig and a Protestant, Ryves was inevitably out of favour with the Roman Catholic King James II and was removed from his office of Serjeant in 1687. Following James's arrival in Ireland in 1689, Ryves was named as one of "the King's enemies" who were proscribed by the Jacobite Patriot Parliament.

Ryves moved to England and supported the Revolution of 1688. Returning to Ireland in 1689, he went as a judge of assize to Ulster, and was then appointed one of the Commissioners of the Great Seal in 1690, and was reappointed serjeant-at-law. He declined an offer to resume the Recordership of Dublin, on the ground that the heavy workload was too much for his increasing ill-health to bear. The offices of Second and Third Serjeants were lucrative but the duties attached were not onerous; his successor as Third Serjeant, Alan Brodrick, admitted that he had almost no work to do. Ryves accepted the post of Baron of the Exchequer.

== Death ==
Ryves suffered from ill health all through his life, and by 1691 he appears to have been almost incapacitated; the previous year he had referred to his "great infirmity". He took a seat on the Court of Exchequer in 1692, but died early the next year.
