= Adam Reuter =

Silesian author

- Occupation: Author

Adam Reuter (fl. 1627) was a Silesian author.

== Biography ==
Reuter was a native of Cottbus in Silesia. He was granted permission to study in the Bodleian Library at Oxford on 3 September 1608 (Oxford Univ. Reg. Oxford Hist. Soc. II. i. 266). He was a licentiate "utriusque juris." Wood, who erroneously calls him a Welshman, says that he continued at Oxford for many years "in the condition of a commoner, for he wore a gown, and was entered into the matricula as a member of Exeter College" (Wood, Athenæ Oxon. ii. 420). He proved himself a learned and ingenious scholar, a good Latinist, and a severe Calvinist.

He published:

- "Quæstiones Juris Controversi 12," Oxford, 1609, dedicated to George Ryves, warden of New College, and the fellows.
- "Oratio Papam esse Bestiam quæ non est et tamen est, apud Johan. Apoc. 17, v. 8," London, 1610, 4to, spoken by the author before the university.
- "Contra Conspiratorum Consilia Orationes duæ habitæ in nobiliss. et antiquiss. Oxoniensi Academia 5 Aug. et 5 Nov. 1610, diebus Regiæ Liberationis Et Conspiratione Gowrie et Tormentaria," dedicated to George, lord Carew, of Clopton, Henry and Thomas Carey, and William Waller, London, 1612.
- "Libertatis Anglicanæ defensio, seu demonstratio Regnum Angliæ non esse feudum pontificis, in nobilissima et antiquissima Oxoniensi Academia publice opposita Martino Becario, S. J.," London, 1613.
- "Eadgarus in Jacobo redivivus seu Pietatis Anglicanæ Defensio contra Rosweydum," London, 1614, 4to.
- "De Consilio tractatus," dedicated to the Earl of Suffolk, Oxford, 1626.
