= William Harty (physician) =

Irish physician

- Born: 1781
- Died: 30 March 1854 (aged 72–73)
- Occupation: Physician

William Harty (1781 – 30 March 1854) was an Irish physician.

== Biography ==
Harty was born in 1781, became a scholar of Trinity College, Dublin, in 1799, proceeded B.A. in 1801, M.B. in 1804, and M.D. in 1830 (thesis on the Dublin bills of mortality). In 1805 he published ‘Dysentery and its Combinations,’ a work which shows thoroughness and scholarship, and illustrates philosophically the doctrine of the correlation of dysentery and typhus. A new and recast edition was issued in 1847. In 1808 he was candidate for the chair of botany in Trinity College. He was appointed physician to the prisons of Dublin, and was consulted at Westminster on the Prisons Bill of 1825. In 1820 he published ‘An Historic Sketch of the Contagious Fever Epidemic in Ireland in 1817–1819,’ one of the best works on the causes and circumstances of Irish typhus, with tables and reports for many parts of the country, and a comparison with the great typhus epidemic of 1741. He became a fellow of the King's and Queen's College of Physicians in 1824, censor in 1826, but resigned his fellowship in 1827, to the regret of the college. In 1836 he drew up a petition to the House of Lords on the Irish Church Bill, which he published in 1837, on the advice of the Bishop of Exeter, with notes and an appendix; his contention was that the Protestant reformation had failed in Ireland on account of the poverty of the people and the insufficient endowment of the church establishment. He died on 30 March 1854.
