= James Deeny =

Irish former chief medical adviser

Chief Medical Adviser of Ireland
- In office 1944–1962
- Preceded by: New office
- Succeeded by: Dr Charlie Lysaght

Personal details
- Born: James Andrew Donnelly Deeny; 7 November 1906 Lurgan, County Armagh, Ireland
- Died: 3 April 1994 (aged 87)
- Education: Clongowes College
- Alma mater: Queen's University, Belfast

James Andrew Donnelly Deeny (7 November 1906 – 3 April 1994) was the Chief Medical Adviser of the Republic of Ireland and a senior administrator in the World Health Organization.

== Background ==
Deeny was born in Lurgan, County Armagh, the son of a Catholic doctor. He was educated at Clongowes College and graduated as a doctor from Queen's University, Belfast at the age of 21. He continued his studies at the Royal College of Physicians in Dublin.

In 1930, he went to Vienna where he worked in The State Service Institute under the auspices of the American Medical Association, specializing in the technology of tuberculosis. In 1931, he joined his father's practice in Lurgan.

== Career in Northern Ireland ==
He first came to prominence in the 1930s after publishing a study on the nutritional deficiencies of male factory workers in Lurgan in the Journal of the Ulster Medical Society. He also conducted an infant mortality survey of Belfast.

He conducted a study of the spread of tuberculosis in Lurgan and showed that the main factor in the spread of the disease was the residence of adolescents in near proximity to a case who had died. This demonstrated how important it was to isolate infectious cases.

Treating two Lurgan "blue men", he discovered the use of ascorbic acid in the treatment of familial idiopathic methemoglobinemia.

He became an expert on pellagra and diagnosed it among his patients. It had not been reported in Ireland before.

There was a strong discrimination against Catholics in the Northern Ireland of the time and Deeny judged that his career would advance better in the Republic of Ireland.

== Career in Dublin ==
In 1944, Deeny was appointed Chief Medical Adviser for Ireland. The two main problems confronting him were tuberculosis, where Ireland had the worst problem in Western Europe, and a high infant and maternal mortality rate. Deeny and his colleagues prepared a plan which led to the Tuberculosis (Establishment of Sanatoria) Act 1945. This allowed the department to acquire land compulsorily for the building of sanatoria. A White Paper Tuberculosis was published in 1946. A battle against tuberculosis began.

Deeny's original appointment was to the Department of Local Government and Public Health but it was felt that health required a separate department. Deeny chaired the Committee on the Health Services which led to the establishment of the new department in early 1947. He was heavily involved in the preparation of the Health Act of 1947 which included the Mother and Child Scheme.

In 1948, Noel Browne became the Minister for Health. He and Deeny did not see eye to eye on aspects of policy and in 1950, Deeny temporarily left the department to carry out a national survey of tuberculosis in Ireland for the Medical Research Council of Ireland. Although he returned to the department in 1953, retiring in 1962, his work in that period was mainly on the international stage.

== The Bessborough affair ==
Some time after taking up the Dublin position, Deeny became aware of extremely high infant mortality rates in the Bessborough mother and baby home run by the Sisters of the Sacred Heart order in Cork. Initial inspection did not show the cause, but on a hunch, Deeny stripped the babies and found that they all had a purulent skin infection and green diarrhoea due to a staphylococcus infection which had been ignored. He closed down the home temporarily and sacked the nun matron and the medical officer. Such a challenge to church personnel was very unusual at the time and a complaint was made by Bishop Daniel Cohalan of Cork to the Papal Nuncio. The Nuncio visited the Taoiseach, Eamon De Valera, but on reviewing the report on the matter, he agreed that the right steps had been taken.

== World Health Organization ==
In May 1948, Deeny attended the first assembly of the World Health Organization (WHO) in Geneva as chief of the Irish delegation. In 1956, he was seconded from the Department of Health to the WHO.

He carried out national tuberculosis surveys on Sri Lanka and Somaliland. Between 1958 and 1960, he produced a national health plan for Indonesia.

In 1962, he was appointed chief of senior staff training at WHO headquarters in Geneva. Coming from a small neutral country, he played a vital role in persuading the Soviet Union to allow the WHO to recruit doctors directly as the Soviets had been insisting on choosing for themselves.

He took formal retirement in 1967, but continued to do consultancy work for the organization. This included writing the Fourth Report on the World Health Situation in 1968 and serving as the WHO's first Ombudsman.

== Later life ==
He returned to private practice for a time in Fanad, County Donegal and while there, conducted a survey of the community.

In 1971, he became Scientific Adviser to Pope Paul VI and helped to set up Cor Unum, the Pontifical Council for Human and Christian Development. This was established to coordinate the work of over 1,000 Catholic charities worldwide.

He finally retired to Tagoat, County Wexford where he ran a 160-acre farm. He founded the Tagoat Community Council and for his community efforts he was named Irish Life Pensioner of the year in 1988.

His autobiography, To Cure and to Care, was published in 1989.

== Awards and honours ==
In 1941, Deeny was elected a fellow of the Royal College of Physicians and in the same year a member of the Royal Irish Academy.

In 1983, he received an Honorary Doctorate in Science from Queen's University, Belfast.

In 1988, he was awarded Irish Life Pensioner of the Year.

In 2012 a Blue Plaque in his memory was erected at his former residence and place of medical practice in Lurgan Town Square.

== Publications ==
- Deeny, James, The Irish worker: a demographic study of the labour force in Ireland, Institute of Public Administration, Dublin 1971.
- Deeny, James, To Cure and to Care: Memoirs of a Chief Medical Officer, The Glendale Press, 1989.
- Deeny, James, The End of an Epidemic: Essays in Irish Public Health 1935-1965, edited by Tony Farmar, Dublin 1995.
