= Breda Smyth =

Irish chief medical officer

Chief Medical Officer of Ireland
- In office November 2022 – May 2024
- Preceded by: Tony Holohan
- Succeeded by: Mary Horgan (interim)

Personal details
- Born: Straide, County Mayo, Ireland
- Spouse: Jimmy Higgins
- Children: 2
- Education: NUI Galway; University College Dublin; RCPI; University of California, Los Angeles

Breda Smyth is an Irish public health doctor who served as Chief Medical Officer of Ireland from November 2022 until May 2024, having previously held the position on an interim basis. She was the first woman to hold the post. She previously was professor for public health medicine in NUI Galway and a consultant in public health in HSE West.

== Education ==
Smyth completed her primary degree in medicine (MB, BCh, BAO) in University College Galway. She then continued her training in the Royal College of Physicians of Ireland (RCPI), undertook a Masters in Public Health in University College Dublin, a Medical Doctorate in NUI Galway and a post-doctoral fellowship in the University of California, Los Angeles.

== Medical career ==
Professor Smyth was conferred as a member of the Faculty of Public Health Medicine of Ireland in 2005, and, in 2013, was made a fellow of the Faculty of Public Health Medicine in Ireland.

Smyth has extensive experience leading national programmes across public health. She was a senior responsible owner on the HSE Public Health Reform programme in 2019. She was the national lead on the Health and Positive Ageing Project and she developed and published the "Healthy and Positive Ageing for All; Research Strategy 2015 – 2019" in collaboration with the Department of Health in 2019. She was also the national stroke prevention lead in the Stroke Clinical Programme 2010 to 2014 leading the pilot opportunistic screening for atrial fibrillation.

Throughout the COVID-19 pandemic, Smyth contributed significantly as a member of the National Public Health Emergency Team (NPHET), the Rapid Testing Expert Advisory Group and as a founding member of the COVID-19 Irish Epidemiological Modelling Advisory Group.

On 15 June 2022, Minister for Health Stephen Donnelly appointed Professor Smyth as Chief Medical Officer of Ireland on an interim basis from 4 July, following the retirement of Dr Tony Holohan. She was announced as the permanent successor on 5 October 2022, becoming the first woman to hold the post.

On 2 February 2024, it was announced that Professor Smyth would be leaving her post as Chief Medical Officer after 18 months to take up an academic role in the Royal College of Surgeons in Ireland.

== Musical career ==
Surrounded by a strong family tradition of Irish music, Smyth plays the fiddle and tin whistle. She and her sister Cora began playing music from a young age and have collectively won over forty All-Ireland titles.

Smyth has toured and performed worldwide as a violinist with Michael Flatley's Lord of the Dance and Feet of Flames which included performances at the Ryder Cup and the Red Cross for the Royal Family in Monaco.

She released her debut album Basil and Thyme in 2002 and was subsequently nominated as female traditional musician of the year by the Irish Music Magazine in 2003. She hosted the Irish Music Magazine Awards in the National Concert Hall, Dublin in October 2003.

== Personal life ==
Professor Smyth is from Straide, County Mayo. She has three siblings, Cora, Maria and Seán. She is married to Jimmy Higgins, a percussionist, and together they have two children, Blathnaid and Donal.

== Selected publications ==
- McAloon, Conor G.; Wall, Patrick; Griffin, John; Casey, Miriam; Barber, Ann; Codd, Mary; Gormley, Eamonn; Butler, Francis; McV Messam, Locksley L.; Walsh, Cathal; Teljeur, Conor; Smyth, Breda; Nolan, Philip; Green, Martin J.; O’Grady, Luke (27 April 2021). "Estimation of the serial interval and proportion of pre-symptomatic transmission events of COVID− 19 in Ireland using contact tracing data". BMC Public Health. 21 (1): 805. doi:10.1186/s12889-021-10868-9. ISSN 1471-2458. PMC 8076671. PMID 33906635.
- B Smyth; P Marsden; R Corcoran; R Walsh; C Brennan; K McSharry; J Clarke; P J Kelly; Harbison, Joseph (2016). "Opportunistic screening for atrial fibrillation in a rural area". QJM. 109 (8): 539–543. doi:10.1093/qjmed/hcw011. PMC 4986429. PMID 26819299. Wikidata Q40050807.

Government offices
Preceded by Dr Tony Holohan	Chief Medical Officer for Ireland; 2022–2024	Succeeded by Mary Horgan (interim)
