= Mary Horgan =

Infectious diseases physician

Mary Horgan is an Irish physician in infectious diseases and president of the Royal College of Physicians of Ireland. She is a member of NPHET, a consultant at Cork University Hospital and the dean of the University College Cork School of Medicine. In June 2024 she was appointed on an interim basis as the Chief Medical Officer of Ireland.

== Career ==
Horgan, who is originally from County Kerry, attended University College Dublin. She graduated with a MB BCh in 1986 and trained as a specialist in infectious diseases at Washington University School of Medicine in St. Louis, Missouri. She received an MD in 1995 and was appointed dean of the University College Cork School of Medicine in 2014. As of 2017, she is also a consultant in infectious diseases at Cork University Hospital and a member of the board of the Health Products Regulatory Authority.

Horgan became a member of the Royal College of Physicians of Ireland (RCPI) in 1988 and was awarded fellowship in 1997. She first became involved in the RCPI's administration in 1999 and was elected president of the college in 2016 for a three-year term beginning in October 2017. She is the first woman to serve as president of the college since its inception in 1654.

In 2019, she was awarded UCD Alumnus of the Year in Health & Agriculture Science.

In January 2021, she was appointed to NPHET.
