= Ronan Glynn =

Irish physician and public health official

Deputy Chief Medical Officer of Ireland
- In office 21 October 2018 – 2 July 2020
- Preceded by: Philip Crowley
- Succeeded by: Himself
- In office 4 October 2020 – 31 May 2022
- Preceded by: Himself
- Succeeded by: Vacant

Chief Medical Officer of Ireland (acting capacity)
- In office 2 July 2020 – 4 October 2020
- Preceded by: Tony Holohan
- Succeeded by: Tony Holohan

Personal details
- Spouse: Carla O'Brien (m. 2013)
- Children: 2
- Education: University College Dublin; University of Aberdeen; NUI Galway

Ronan Glynn is an Irish public health physician and physiotherapist who served as Deputy Chief Medical Officer of Ireland from October 2018 to May 2022. He previously served as Acting Chief Medical Officer of Ireland from July to October 2020, and was Head of the Health Protection Unit at the Department of Health.

== Medical career ==
Glynn graduated from University College Dublin, where he obtained a Bachelor of Science in Physiotherapy, in 2002. He completed a Bachelor of Medicine, Bachelor of Surgery at the University of Aberdeen in 2007, a PhD in Surgical Oncology from NUI Galway in 2013 and a first-class honours Masters in Public Health (MPH) from University College Dublin in 2015.

Between 2008 and 2010, Glynn was Research Registrar at the National Breast Cancer Research Institute (NBCRI) in University College Hospital Galway. Between 2010 and 2014, he was Senior House Officer and Specialist Registrar at the Health Service Executive (Otolaryngology). Between 2014 and 2018, he was Specialist Registrar and Specialist in Public Health Medicine at the HSE.

Glynn holds a diploma in personal leadership and executive coaching. He has been a member of the Royal College of Surgeons in Ireland since 2012, a Fellow of the International Society for Quality in Healthcare (ISQUA) since 2013, and a Member of the Royal College of Physicians of Ireland (Faculty of Public Health Medicine), since 2017.

Glynn was appointed Deputy Chief Medical Officer in October 2018. He became a regular presence at the daily COVID-19 press conferences, along with the CMO, Dr Tony Holohan, and made multiple media appearances following the COVID-19 pandemic's emergence and its subsequent arrival in Ireland. On 2 July 2020, Holohan made an announcement that he would be taking a hiatus from his position as Chief Medical Officer to care for his family as his wife entered palliative care with multiple myeloma; Glynn was subsequently appointed Acting Chief Medical Officer until 5 October 2020.

Aside from the frequent pandemic press conferences, he gave a televised interview to The Late Late Show on 4 September 2020.

He was awarded Best Doctor of The Year by RTÉ Radio 1 in 2020.

On 10 May 2022, the Department of Health announced that Glynn would resign at the end of the month to take up a role with consultancy firm EY which commenced in September.

In November 2022, he was appointed as Adjunct Full Professor at the UCD Michael Smurfit Graduate Business School.

== Personal life ==
In September 2013, Glynn married Carla O'Brien, newsreader for RTÉ News, and they have two children.

Government offices
Preceded by Phillip Crowley	Deputy Chief Medical Officer of Ireland; 2018–2022	Succeeded by Vacant
Preceded by Tony Holohan	Chief Medical Officer of Ireland (acting); 2020	Succeeded by Tony Holohan
