= Tony Holohan =

Irish former chief medical officer

Chief Medical Officer of Ireland
- In office 21 May 2008^{[a]} – 1 July 2022
- Deputy: Ronan Glynn
- Preceded by: Jim Kiely
- Succeeded by: Breda Smyth

Personal details
- Born: William Gerard Anthony Holohan; 1967 (age 58–59) Dublin, Ireland
- Spouses: Emer Feely (m. 1995; died 2021) Ciara Cronin (m. 2025)
- Children: 2
- Education: CBS Sexton Street
- Alma mater: University College Dublin; RCSI
- ^aHolohan temporarily stepped back as CMO due to family issues on 2 June 2020. Deputy CMO Ronan Glynn was appointed to the office until his return in October 2020.

William Gerard Anthony Holohan is an Irish public health physician who served as Chief Medical Officer of Ireland from May 2008 to 1 July 2022. Fergal Bowers described him as being "as familiar as Dr Anthony Fauci in the US and arguably as influential".

Holohan's 14 years leading Ireland's public health strategy encompassed the 2009 swine flu pandemic, the CervicalCheck cancer scandal and the COVID-19 pandemic. He became a prominent figure during the COVID-19 pandemic in Ireland, when he chaired the National Public Health Emergency Team (NPHET), while simultaneously supporting his children and wife as she battled a cancer diagnosis.

In March 2022, he announced his intention to step down as Chief Medical Officer, after being appointed as Professor of Public Health Strategy and Leadership at Trinity College Dublin. This caused several days of controversy, and as a result, Holohan announced his retirement as CMO on 1 July and would not take up his planned academic position at TCD.

== Career ==
=== Chief Medical Officer ===
Holohan was appointed Deputy Chief Medical Officer in 2001, followed by promotion to Chief Medical Officer in December 2008.

==== CervicalCheck scandal ====
Holohan gained prominence during the 2018 CervicalCheck cancer scandal. At the time, a retrospective audit on the cervical smear programme took place which focused on previous smear results of patients diagnosed with cervical cancer. The result of the audit showed that 206 women with a known diagnosis of cervical cancer, had a false negative result on a previous smear test. The results of the retrospective audit were not disclosed to the women in question, with the likely rationale being that disclosure would not change the patient's (who had a known diagnosis of cervical cancer) clinical outcome. It was reported that Dr Grainne Flannelly, CervicalCheck's clinical director, had advised a gynaecologist not to advise women about the re-evaluated test results, but to file the results instead. A number of these women sued the Health Service Executive (HSE).

Holohan stated that the Department of Health was aware of CervicalCheck's stance of not informing some women of the outcomes of reviews into their cases, and that a decision was taken not to escalate the matter to the Minister for Health, telling a review panel: "It was reasonable because the information provided in the briefing notes provided by the HSE to the Department was evidence of ongoing improvement to how the service was being delivered, rather than the identification of a problem which, of its nature, required escalation to ministerial level."

Later, as a result of the facts uncovered by the Serious Incident Management Team, officials in the Department of Health and The Chief Medical Officer (Tony Holohan), the Scally review was commissioned. In September 2018, Dr Gabriel Scally showed that there was no proof that the performance of the cervical smear programme, or rates of discordant smears, fell below what is expected of such a program. Similarly, he found no proof of coverup by stakeholders. Dr Gabriel Scally did however find fault with the failure to disclose retrospective audit results to women, despite them having a known diagnosis of cervical cancer. After the announcement and publication of the Scally report, which gave the screening programme a clean bill of health Dr Scally went to great lengths to defend the existing cervical screening programme and reinforce public confidence in it. The Scally report was noted to contrast dramatically with the political hysteria of the early 'scandal'.

==== COVID-19 pandemic ====
On 29 February 2020, Holohan announced the first case of severe acute respiratory syndrome coronavirus 2, the virus responsible for coronavirus disease 2019, and that the resulting pandemic had spread to Ireland. He gave a televised interview to The Late Late Show on 17 April 2020.

Holohan chaired the National Public Health Emergency Team (NPHET), a group responsible for the state's responses to the COVID-19 pandemic in Ireland from the beginning of the pandemic until it disbanded in February 2022.

On 2 July 2020, Holohan made an announcement that he would be taking a hiatus from his position as Chief Medical Officer to care for his family as his wife entered palliative care with multiple myeloma. Deputy Chief Medical Officer Ronan Glynn was temporarily appointed to the office until his return in October 2020.

On 10 June 2021, Holohan received an Honorary Fellowship from the Royal College of Surgeons in Ireland in recognition of his outstanding leadership during the COVID-19 pandemic.

On 16 June 2021, he accepted the Freedom of the City of Dublin on behalf of all healthcare workers during the COVID-19 pandemic.

==== Trinity College appointment controversy ====
On 25 March 2022, Holohan announced that he would step down as Chief Medical Officer on 1 July, after being appointed as Professor of Public Health Strategy and Leadership at Trinity College Dublin.

The confusion over the role began when it was announced on 6 April that he would remain a civil servant and the Department of Health would continue to pay his €187,000 salary. In a statement, the department said that Holohan's new role was an "open-ended secondment" that was "in the public interest" because of the skills he could bring to the third-level sector.

The next day, he told a private session of the Oireachtas Health Committee that he had agreed to "relinquish" his role as CMO and would not be returning to it "at any point in the future".

On 8 April, Taoiseach Micheál Martin said there had to be greater transparency around the planned academic role for Holohan at Trinity College, and that the matter had to be paused and reassessed until he received a report from Minister for Health Stephen Donnelly. On the same day, the Irish Independent reported that Holohan's salary would be €30,000 higher than other professors working at Trinity College.

On 9 April, as a result of the controversy, Holohan announced that he would retire as CMO on 1 July and would not take up the academic position at Trinity College. In a statement, he said he did not wish to see the controversy continue.

=== Other ventures ===
On 7 July 2022, Holohan announced that he would be starting a new position as an adjunct full professor of public health at University College Dublin, with no salary attached to the position.

On 15 September 2022, it was announced that Holohan would be joining the non-executive voluntary board of the Irish Hospice Foundation.

On 13 October 2022, Enfer Medical Ltd. announced that Holohan had been appointed chair of its medical advisory board. The company is an independent laboratory facility providing testing services for sexual health, respiratory health, gut health and genomics.

On 2 November 2022, aCGT Vector, a government part-funded start-up working on developing new treatment solutions for cancer, announced that Holohan had been appointed as non-executive chair of its new strategic advisory board". The board completed its work in April 2023.

On 22 February 2024, UCD announced that Holohan would take up the role of Director of the Centre for One Health at UCD, Dublin. At the launch of the Centre, Holohan said: "If mankind is to protect human wellbeing and health from threats such as pandemics, obesity and antibiotic resistance, we need to better understand the links between our wellbeing and the health of the planet and all its plants and animals."

In 2024, he joined the board of An Taisce.

== Personal life ==
Holohan was born in Dublin and raised in Limerick. His primary education was at Monaleen N.S.; his secondary education took place at the CBS Sexton Street. He graduated from medical school at University College Dublin in 1991. After training in general practice, he also trained in public health medicine, graduating with a Masters in Public Health (MPH) in 1996. Holohan holds a diploma in healthcare management from the Royal College of Surgeons in Ireland. He is a member of the Irish College of General Practitioners (MICGP) and is a Fellow of the Faculty of Public Health Medicine of the Royal College of Physicians of Ireland (FFPHMI).

In 2015, Holohan was awarded the UCD Alumni Award in Public Health.

He met his wife Emer Feely while in medical school, who later became a specialist in public health medicine. The couple have two children, a son and a daughter. His wife died in February 2021 following a long battle with multiple myeloma.

On 21 September 2023, Holohan launched the publication of his memoir, We Need To Talk, written with Emily Hourican, at an event in Dublin. The book covers his early life, his time studying medicine, where he met his future wife. He recounts in detail her diagnosis of blood cancer, multiple myeloma, and subsequent treatment, and its impact on her life and family, over a period of nine years until her death in 2021. Holohan also writes about his time as Chief Medical Officer, covering various public events, including Swine Flu, Cervical Check Audit, and the COVID-19 pandemic.

Reviewing the book for the Irish Independent, Danielle Barron wrote: "this is a book about grief as much as it is a book about being one of the most polarising characters in public health. To err is human. But doctors, as we so often forget, are human, and Dr Holohan has humanised himself with this searingly honest and personal book."

Holohan appeared on The Late Late Show on 22 September 2023 and spoke about the "difficult" day of his wife's funeral and opened up about the "impactful" moments on the day in an emotional interview with new host Patrick Kielty.

== See also ==
- Michael J. Ryan (doctor)

Government offices
Preceded by Jim Kiely	Chief Medical Officer for Ireland; 2008–2022	Succeeded by Professor Breda Smyth
