= John Stearns (disambiguation) =

John Stearns (1951–2022) was an American baseball player and coach.

John Stearns may also refer to:

- John Stearns (physician) (1770–1848), American physician
- John Goddard Stearns Jr. (1843–1917), American architect
- John O. Stearns (died 1910), American politician
- Johnny Stearns (1916–2001), American actor, producer and director

== See also ==
- Jonathan Sterns (1751–1798), Loyalist
- John Stearne (disambiguation)
