= Membership of the Royal College of Physicians of Ireland =

Irish professional medical qualification

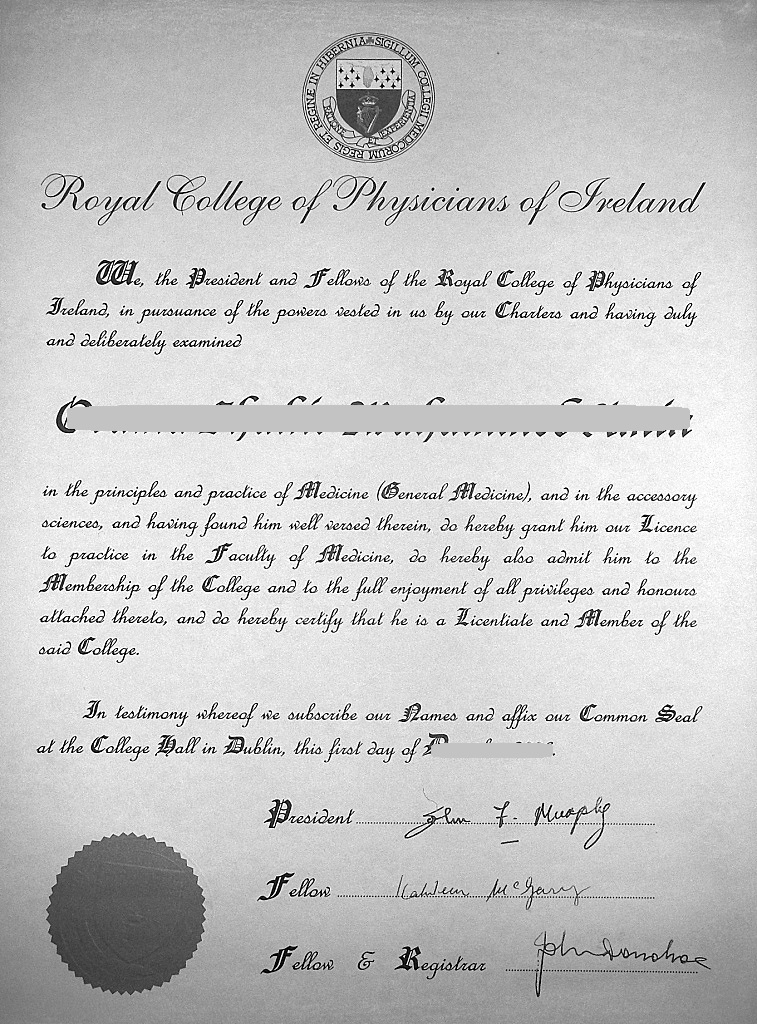
Membership diploma of the Royal College of Physicians of Ireland, MRCPI in general internal medicine

Membership of the Royal College of Physicians of Ireland (MRCPI) is a postgraduate medical qualification in the field of general internal medicine awarded by the Royal College of Physicians of Ireland (RCPI) through examination. The MRCPI in general internal medicine is accredited by the Irish Medical Council as the foremost knowledge-based assessment for internal medicine in Ireland. In addition, many countries worldwide recognize the qualification as a postgraduate degree in internal medicine and designate its holder as a specialist physician. The three parts of the MRCPI examinations are held throughout the Republic of Ireland and its overseas centers (Malaysia, Saudi Arabia, United Arab Emirates, Bahrain and Oman). The MRCPI in general internal medicine is the flagship qualification and examination of the RCPI and should be differentiated from its other postgraduate qualifications awarded through examinations in other specialities (e.g., MRCPI in pediatrics or MRCPI in obstetrics and gynecology).

== History ==
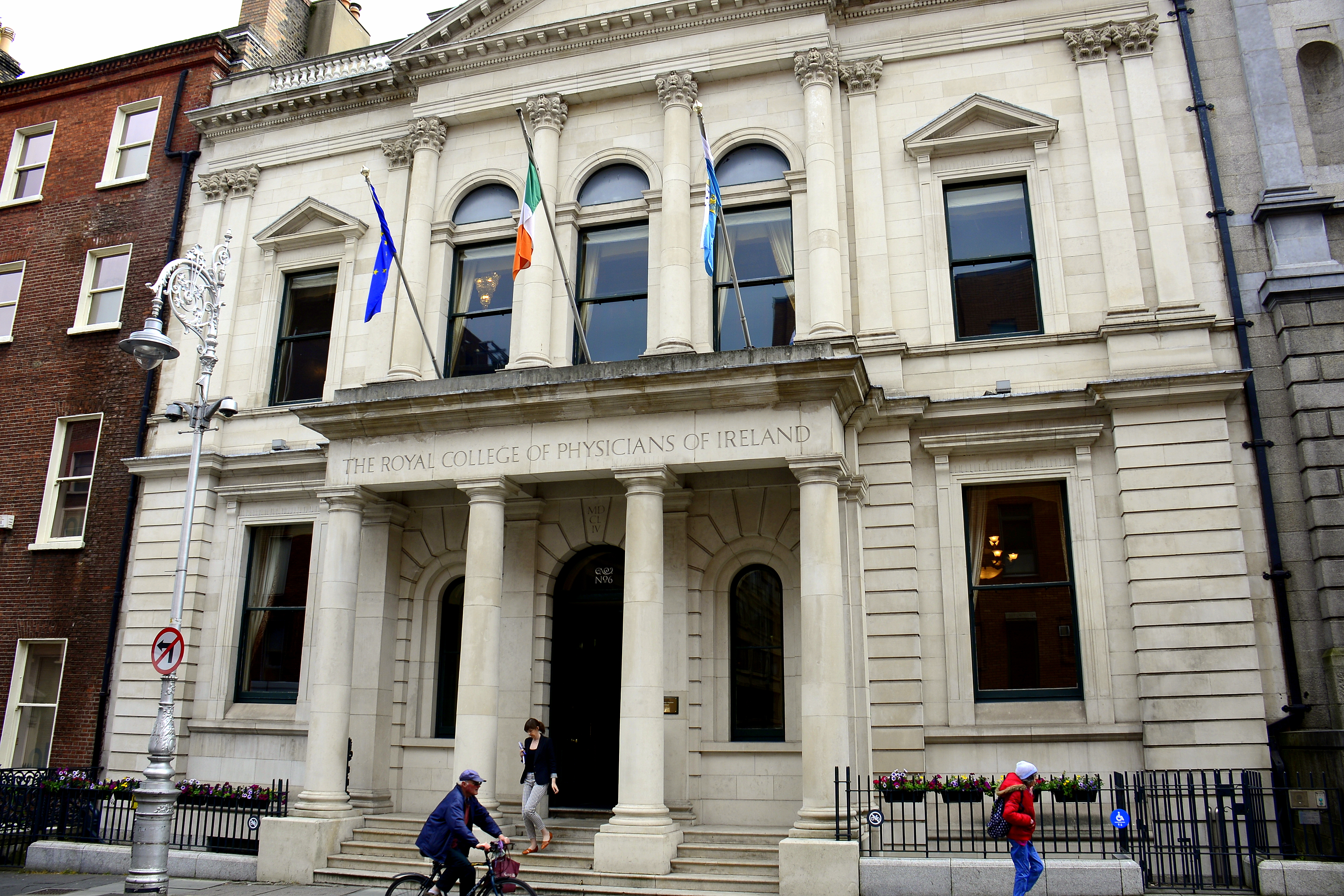
The Royal College of Physicians of Ireland, No. 6 Kildare Street

The RCPI (then Fraternity of Physicians of Trinity Hall) was founded in 1654 by Dr. John Stearne, who was a professor of medicine at the Trinity College Dublin, in order to improve the practice of medicine in Ireland. The Medical Act 1858 (of then the United Kingdom of Great Britain and Ireland) introduced the registration of medical practitioners for the first time. Under this act, the RCPI was named one of the recognized awarding bodies for medical qualifications in Ireland. An outstanding milestone developed in the year 1877 when the RCPI took advantage of the Medical Act 1876. The bill removed restrictions on the granting of qualifications for registration under the Medical Act 1858 on the ground of sex. Therefore, the Medical Act 1876 allowed medical colleges to admit women to medicine. Eliza Walker Dunbar, a Scottish doctor, was the first woman to become a licentiate of the RCPI on January 10, 1877, and the first woman to be allowed to practice medicine in the United Kingdom of Great Britain and Ireland.

In 1879, the RCPI introduced membership in the college, as a step between licentiateship and fellowship, in response to an increasing number of medical practitioners in Ireland. Ten years later, the RCPI and the Royal College of Surgeons in Ireland established the Irish Conjoint Board. The latter awarded joint licentiates of the two colleges, which meet the terms of the Medical Act 1886. In 1972, membership examinations were introduced to allow physicians not involved in the RCPI to be fast-tracked to fellowship. After 5 years, the category of collegiate membership was introduced. For the very first time in the history of the RCPI, its MRCPI examination was conducted outside the Republic of Ireland. To cope with the global advancement in technology, in January 2016, the part I written examination of the MRCPI in general internal medicine was conducted for the first time using a computer-based testing system.

On 30 March 2021, the RCPI announced that the General Medical Council (GMC) of the United Kingdom has recognized five qualifications (including the MRCPI in general internal medicine awarded after 1 January 2007) issued by the Royal College of Physicians of Ireland on their list of acceptable postgraduate qualifications for the purposes of full GMC registration. The global COVID-19 crisis had a prominent impact on several aspects of postgraduate training and examinations (written and clinical). The RCPI was the first postgraduate medical college in Ireland or the UK to deliver a computer-based assessment (MRCPI part I and part II written exams), with large scale numbers, via a remote invigilation platform in July 2020.

== Parts ==
The MRCPI in general internal medicine is composed of three parts; part I written, part II written, and part II clinical. Throughout history, each part has undergone several changes in its format and displays specific regulations for cancelation policy and appeals.

Doctors can appear in the MRCPI in general internal medicine part I examination six months (or more) after graduation. The MRCPI part I consists of one paper with 100 questions in a best of fives format, to be completed within three hours (there is no break). There is no negative marking and each question is equally weighted. As of January 2019, the maximum number of times a candidate can sit any part of an MRCPI examination will be limited to six attempts. In addition, candidates should pass the part I examination within six years of their first attempt. Holders of certain qualifications (e.g., MRCPUK, FRACP, or the American Board in general internal medicine) are exempted from appearing in the part I written exam and can directly participate in the part II written exam. The cost of the examination varies every year, but currently, the fees are €630 in Ireland and €710 in overseas centres.

Candidates can appear in the part II written examination after they pass their part I written exam (or have been granted an exemption). The part II written exam consists of two papers. Each paper has 75 questions in a best of fives format, to be completed within 2.5 hours. There is a 90-minute break between these two papers (also applicable for remote invigilation during the COVID-19 pandemic). There is no negative marking and each question is equally weighted. Fellows of the Royal Australasian College of Physicians (FRACP) are exempted from appearing in the part II written exam and can directly take the part II clinical one. In 2022, the fee to appear in the part II written exam is €650 in Ireland while it costs €710 if candidates take the exam in one of the RCPI's overseas centers.

To participate in the part II clinical examination, candidates must have passed the MPCPI in general internal medicine part II written within the last three years (or have been granted an exemption). If this three-year period has expired, candidates should re-sit the part II written exam. The part II clinical exam assesses the candidates' clinical skills, such as history taking, examination techniques, and decision making. Currently, this part is conducted in Ireland and some of the RCPI's overseas centers (Malaysia, Saudi Arabia, United Arab Emirates, and Oman). The exam consists of two 25-minute long cases and five 10-minute short cases (one of which is a communication and ethics interaction with a role player). The fee to sit part II clinical examinations is €780 in Ireland or €1,360 outside Ireland.

== The MRCPI diploma ==
Passing the part II clinical examination marks the end of all examination parts. However, such candidates are not considered members of the RCPI and are not entitled to use the post-nominal letters "MRCPI" until they have been conferred and awarded their diplomas. The admission ceremony can be attended in person or in absentia. During the COVID-19 pandemic, the RCPI has conducted online virtual membership conferring ceremonies. After achieving membership, members may choose to become "collegiate" members of the RCPI. Collegiate members enjoy a range of exclusive benefits from the RCPI. As of January 2022, there are 6,039 collegiate members (holders of the MRCPI in general internal medicine who have paid their annual subscription fees).
