= William Ryves =

English barrister (1570–1647)

Sir William Ryves (1570–1647) was a barrister and judge, and a member of a distinguished Dorsetshire family. He enjoyed a successful legal career in Ireland, holding office as Attorney-General for Ireland and as a justice of the Court of King's Bench (Ireland). For a time he acted as Deputy to the Lord Chancellor of Ireland.

== Family and early career ==
He was born in 1570, the sixth son of John Ryves (1532–1587) of Damory Court, near Blandford, Dorset, and Elizabeth Marvyn (died 1609), daughter of Sir John Marvyn of Fonthill Gifford and his first wife Jane Baskerville of Sherborne. He belonged to a gifted family: one of his brothers, Sir Thomas Ryves, was considered to be the leading expert on ecclesiastical and Admiralty law of his time, and another brother George Ryves was Warden of New College, Oxford. Dr. Bruno Ryves, royal chaplain and later Dean of Windsor, was his first cousin, and Sir John Davies, whom William replaced as Irish Attorney General, was a close connection by marriage (his wife being a great-granddaughter of Sir John Marvyn). The extended family circle also included another senior Irish judge of English birth, Sir Robert Napier, the Chief Baron of the Irish Exchequer, whose daughter Anne was the first wife of William's eldest brother Sir John Ryves.

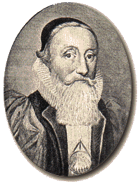
Sir John Davies

William entered the Middle Temple in 1593 and was called to the Bar in 1600. He was made a Bencher of the Middle Temple in 1619. He lived for some years in Oxford and owned substantial property at St. Giles. His first judicial appointment was as a justice of the Carmarthen circuit.

== Irish career ==
William and his brother Thomas both made full use of their family connection with Sir John Davies, and on Davies' recommendation, William succeeded him as Attorney-General for Ireland in 1619 and was given a knighthood. King James I in the patent appointing Ryves noted that this office, and the office of Solicitor-General for Ireland, were invariably the King's own personal choice. He also stressed the importance of both offices, they being the officials in whom above all others the King placed his special trust for the preservation of his revenues and possessions. This suggests that they already ranked informally ahead of the Serjeant-at-law.

Ryves arrived in Ireland in October 1619. At an unknown date, he entered the King's Inns. As Attorney General, he acted regularly as an extra judge of assize, and sat in the Irish House of Commons as member for Belturbet in the Parliament of 1634-5. He was granted the right to hold a fair and weekly market at Rathsallagh, County Wicklow in 1632: he also acquired an estate in County Carlow, and another at Ballyfermot, near Dublin. He became Treasurer of the King's Inns in 1639 and served as one of its trustees. Unlike Davies he seems to have made no effort as Attorney General to influence Government policy: he has been described as simply "a cog in the administrative machine".

While he had depended on his connection to Sir John Davies (who died late in 1626) for his early advancement, his subsequent promotion was due to the patronage of Thomas Wentworth, 1st Earl of Strafford, the formidable and virtually all-powerful Lord Deputy of Ireland. On Strafford's recommendation Ryves became second justice of the King's Bench in 1636.

Strafford's downfall in 1640–41, leading to his execution for treason, did not damage Ryves' career as it did that of some of his colleagues, notably Sir Richard Bolton, the Lord Chancellor. Parliament resolved in May 1641 that Bolton was unfit to preside as Speaker of the Irish House of Lords, and Ryves was appointed to act in his place. He acted in this capacity in 1641–2 and again in 1644. For many years after his death his widow Dorothy as his executor pursued a claim for £3000 due to him as his salary as Speaker.

After the outbreak of the Irish Rebellion of 1641, he lost much of his Irish property: he evidently considered moving back to England, but in fact, spent his last years in Dublin. He visited England for the last time in 1643. He died in Dublin in March 1647 and was buried in the Church of St. John the Evangelist, Dublin.

Rather surprisingly for so eminent a lawyer, he left only a nunciaptive will i.e. he gave verbal instructions on his deathbed as to the disposition of the estate to those present, of whom we know the name of one, Mrs Verschoyle. Of his children, Charles, John and Elizabeth received legacies (George died about the same time as his father).

== Character ==
Ryves has been described as one of the most gifted members of a gifted family. Elrington Ball however criticizes him as one of those judges who owed everything to Strafford, and later betrayed his trust by working closely with Parliament in bringing down both Strafford and his friend Bolton.

== Marriages and children ==
Little is known of Ryves' first wife: her family name is variously given as Jackson, Bingley and Latham. By this marriage he had nine children, three daughters and six sons, of whom seven reached adulthood, including:

- Charles (died 1675), who married Jane Ogden and was the father of Sir Richard Ryves, Commissioner of the Great Seal for Ireland, Jerome Ryves, Dean of St Patrick's Cathedral, Dublin, Elizabeth Vincent and Dorothy Stearne;
- John, a barrister of Middle Temple;
- Thomas (died 1618);
- William (died 1642), who married Elizabeth Bagshawe, daughter of Sir Edward Bagshawe, MP for Banagher, and had four sons;
- George (died 1647), Master in Chancery and judge of the prerogative court, who married Anne Bagshawe, younger sister of Elizabeth, and had two daughters who died young. Anne remarried Thomas Richardson of Tomassan, County Cavan, son of John Richardson, Bishop of Ardagh;
- Elizabeth, the eldest daughter, who married firstly Sir Arthur Leigh, 2nd Baronet of Tyrone (died 1638), secondly John Bingley and thirdly Alderman William Smyth.

Ryves' second wife was Dorothy Waldron, daughter of John Waldron or Waldram. She was probably a sister of Elizabeth Waldron, who married William's brother Thomas. She remarried after Ryves' death John Ferrar of Dromore. They had one daughter Dorothy, who married as his third wife Richard Barry, 2nd Earl of Barrymore. In 1656 Lady Ryves ("Dame Dorothy") and Ferrar brought a lawsuit to recover a loan made by her first husband, who had appointed her his sole executor of his will. She was still living in 1675, when she transferred her claim to £3000, which was due to her first husband as the arrears of his salary as Speaker of the Lords, to her son-in-law Lord Barrymore as a marriage portion for her daughter. She had been seeking repayment of the arrears of salary since 1669 at the latest.

The Ryves family of Upper Court, County Kilkenny, who died out in the male line at the end of the eighteenth century, seem to have been the last surviving branch of the Irish family. James Ryves, yet another brother of William and Thomas, settled in County Kerry, married a daughter of Thomas Spring of Castlemaine, and left issue.

Legal offices
Preceded by John Davies	Attorney-General for Ireland; 1619-1636	Succeeded by Richard Osbaldeston
