= Faculty of Occupational Medicine (Ireland) =

- Established: 1976
- Affiliations: Royal College of Physicians of Ireland
- Dean: Blánaid Hayes
- Location: Dublin, Ireland
- Website: www.rcpi.ie/faculties/faculty-of-occupational-medicine

The Faculty of Occupational Medicine (FOM) is a faculty of the Royal College of Physicians of Ireland. It is the standard-setting organisation for occupational medicine in Ireland.

== Membership ==
Membership of the faculty is open to physicians who have passed the faculty's examinations and maintain appropriate continuous professional development.

== Examinations ==
The faculty has two examinations:

- Licenciateship of the Faculty of Occupational Medicine (LFOM) is intended as a basic benchmark of competence for doctors working in occupational medicine, and is the first postgraduate examination for doctors specialising in the field.
- Membership of the Faculty of Occupational Medicine (MFOM) is a more advanced qualification that is mandatory for completion of specialist registrar training, allowing the doctor to be appointed as a consultant.

Members of four years' standing and who are deemed to have contributed to the development of the speciality of occupational medicine may be elected to Fellowship of the Faculty of Occupational Medicine (FFOM), but there is no separate examination associated with this.

The faculty holds its examinations concurrently in centres in Malaysia and the United Arab Emirates as well as in Ireland.
