= Jerome Ryves =

Irish Anglican Dean

Jerome Ryves, M.A. was an Irish Anglican Dean.

He belonged to the Irish branch of the gifted and numerous Ryves family of Dorset, whose principal seat was Damory Court, near Blandford. He was the son of Charles Ryves (died 1675), Master in the Court of Chancery, and his wife Jane Ogden, and grandson of Sir William Ryves, justice of the Court of King's Bench (Ireland), the first of the family to settle in Ireland. Sir Richard Ryves, Recorder of Dublin, was his brother.

Educated at Trinity College, Dublin, he was Chancellor of St Patrick’s Cathedral, Dublin from 1690 to 1699; and Dean St. Patrick's Cathedral Dublin from 1699 until his death on 1 February 1705.

He married Anne Maude, daughter of Anthony Maude of County Tipperary and Alice Hartstonge, daughter of Sir Standish Hartstonge, 1st Baronet, Baron of the Court of Exchequer (Ireland), and sister of Sir Robert Maude, 1st Baronet. They had one daughter Anne (or Alice), who married Thomas le Hunt. The marriage provided Jerome with a useful link to the Church of Ireland hierarchy, as his wife was a niece of John Hartstonge, who became Bishop of Ossory in 1693.
