= John Stearne (physician) =

Irish academic and physician

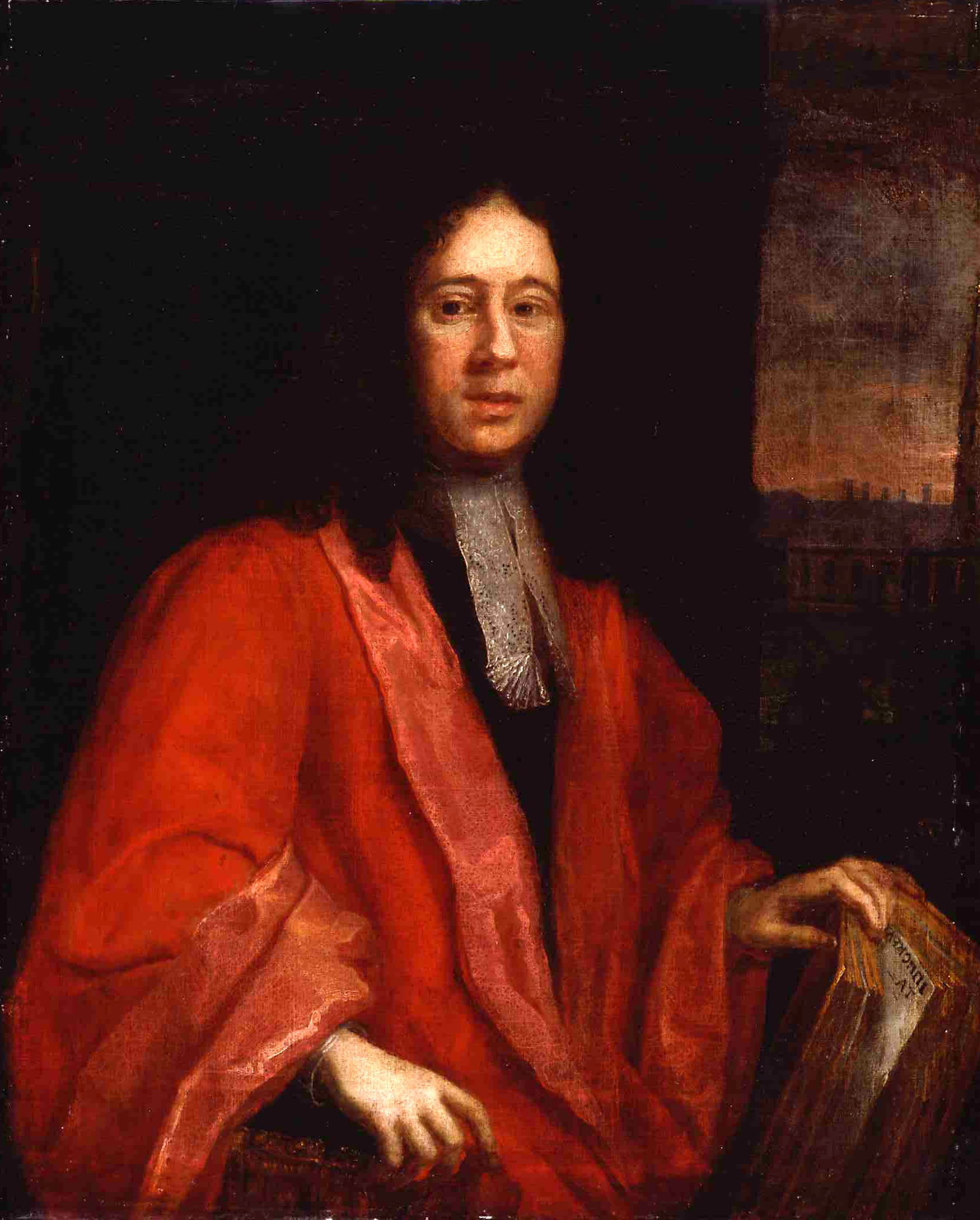
John Stearne, by Thomas Pooley

John Stearne or Sterne (1624–1669) was an Irish academic, founder of the Irish College of Physicians.

== Early life ==
He was born on 26 November 1624 at Ardbraccan, the episcopal palace of his grand-uncle, James Ussher, at that point bishop of Meath. His father John Stearne of Cambridge, who settled in County Down and married Mabel Bermingham, a niece of Ussher, was a remote relation of Archbishop Richard Sterne.

Stearne entered Trinity College, Dublin at the age of 15 in 1639, and obtained a scholarship in 1641. On the outbreak of the Irish Rebellion of 1641, Stearne left for England, and in 1643 went to Cambridge, where he studied medicine at Sidney Sussex College and collected material for his first work, Animi Medela. He remained at Cambridge for about seven years and then spent some time at Oxford, where he was welcomed by Seth Ward, then fellow of Wadham College. He had been elected a fellow of Trinity College, Dublin in 1643, a position from which he was ejected by order of the Rump Parliament. On his return to Ireland in 1651, he was restored to his fellowship by Henry Cromwell, with whom he was on good terms, and to whom he dedicated one of his books.

== At Dublin ==
In 1656, Stearne was appointed the first Hebrew lecturer in Trinity College, Dublin, receiving the degree of M.D. in 1658, and that of LL.D. in 1660. In 1659, he resigned his fellowship; but was appointed to a senior fellowship in 1660, after the Restoration, receiving a dispensation from the statutes of the university respecting celibacy. He became the same year professor of law. During his tenure in these various offices, Stearne practised as a physician in Dublin, obtaining special permission to reside outside the walls of the college.

Stearne is best known as the founder of the Irish College of Physicians. In 1660, he proposed to the university that Trinity Hall, situated in Back Lane, Dublin, then affiliated to the university, of which he had been constituted president in 1654, should be a college of physicians. The arrangement was sanctioned, and Stearne, on the nomination of the provost and senior fellows of Trinity College, in whom the appointment was vested, became its first president. No students were to be admitted who did not belong to Trinity College.

In 1662, Stearne was appointed, for life, professor of medicine at the university. In 1667, a charter was granted to the College of Physicians, under which a governing body of fourteen fellows was constituted—of whom Sir William Petty was one—with Stearne at their head as president for life.

== Death ==
Stearne died in Dublin on 18 November 1669 in his 44th year. He was buried, by his own request, in the chapel of Trinity College, where his epitaph, by his friend Henry Dodwell the elder, described him as Philosophus, Medicus, summusque Theologus idem.

== Works ==
Stearne wrote the following works, published in Dublin:

- Animi Medela, dedicated to Henry Cromwell, 1653.
- Thanatologia, 1656.
- Adriani Heerboordii disputationum de concursu examen, 1660.
- De Electione et Reprobatione, 1662.
- Aphorismi de Felicitate, 1664.
- De Destinatione, posthumously published and edited by Henry Dodwell, his pupil and literary executor, 1672.

== Family ==
By his marriage in 1659 to Dorothy, daughter of Charles Ryves, examiner to the Court of Chancery (Ireland), and sister of Sir Richard Ryves, Recorder of Dublin, Stearne had issue three daughters and one son, John Sterne, Bishop of Clogher.
