= Thomas Ryves =

Sir Thomas Ryves (c. 1583–1652) was an English civilian (i.e. non-criminal lawyer under the common law legal system). He was a member of a prominent Dorset gentry family. He became a specialist in ecclesiastical law and Admiralty law.

== Background and early career ==
Thomas Ryves was born around 1583, eighth son of John Ryves (1532–1587) of Damory Court, near Blandford, Dorset, and his wife Elizabeth Marvyn (died 1609), daughter of Sir John Marvyn of Fonthill Gifford and his first wife Jane Baskerville. He belonged to a highly regarded family: one of his brothers, Sir William Ryves, became Attorney General for Ireland and a judge of the Court of King's Bench (Ireland); another brother, George Ryves, became Warden of New College, Oxford. Dr. Bruno Ryves, royal chaplain and Dean of Windsor was a first cousin; and Sir John Davies, William Ryves' predecessor as Irish Attorney General, was his relative by marriage (he married a descendant of Sir John Marvyn). Sir Robert Napier, Chief Baron of the Exchequer, was the father-in-law of Thomas' eldest brother, Sir John Ryves. Yet another brother James settled in County Kerry.

His father, who was about 50 when Thomas was born, died when he was very young. Ryves entered Winchester College in 1590 and became a fellow of New College, Oxford in 1598. He took his degree of Bachelor of Common Law in 1605 and his doctorate in 1610; he is also said to have studied for a time in France. In 1612 he became an advocate of Doctors' Commons.

== Irish career ==
Thomas and his brother William relied on their family connection with Sir John Davies to advance their careers. In 1612 Thomas accompanied Davies on his return to Ireland and did "good service" in helping him manage the Irish Parliament of 1613–15, where after a fierce struggle Davies was elected Speaker of the House of Commons. In 1617 Thomas was appointed judge of the Irish Court of Faculties. As a result, he became embroiled in a long dispute with James Ussher, Archbishop of Armagh, and other leading clerics, who argued that only a clergyman in holy orders should hold the office. Although Thomas is said to have been greatly respected in Ireland for his legal ability, he eventually resigned the office and returned to England in 1621.

== Later career ==
Ryves built up a large practice in the English Admiralty Court, and was made King's Advocate in 1625. In 1626 he became a master of the Court of Requests; in 1636 he became the Admiralty judge for Dover, and later judge for the Cinque Ports.

On the outbreak of the English Civil War he joined the King's side, and despite his age is said to have fought with great courage in several battles and been wounded. In 1648 the King chose him as one of his commissioners to negotiate with Parliament. He died in London early in 1652 and was buried in St. Clement Danes. His married Elizabeth Waldron, of the Waldron, or Waldram family of Leicester This was one of several marriages between the two families: she was probably a sister of Dorothy Waldron, the second wife of Thomas's brother William. They had no children.

== Character ==
Ryves was renowned for his knowledge of both civil law and common law, his wider learning and his skill in Latin. He enjoyed the trust and confidence of King Charles I, and displayed courage and loyalty to the Crown in his later years, although Archbishop Ussher disliked and distrusted him.

== Works ==
Ryves published books on law and naval history, and a lengthy defence of King James I's administration in Ireland. Probably his best-known work is The Poor Vicar's Plea (1620), an argument in favour of the right of Irish vicars to receive tithes.
