= Bruno Ryves =

English priest (1596–1677)

Bruno Ryves (1596–1677) was an English royalist churchman, editor in 1643 of the Oxford newsbook Mercurius Rusticus, and later dean of Chichester and dean of Windsor. His first name was variously spelt Brune, Bruen, Brian, Bruno, and his surname Reeves, Rives, Ryve, Reeve, and Ryves.

== Life ==
Ryves was son of Thomas, and grandson of John Ryves of Damory Court, Dorset. George Ryves, Sir Thomas Ryves and Sir William Ryves were his first cousins. He was educated at Oxford, subscribing as a clerk of New College in 1610. He graduated B.A. in 1616, and in the following year became a clerk of Magdalen College, proceeding M.A. 9 June 1619, B.D. 20 June 1632, and D.D. 25 June 1639.

He was admitted to Gray's Inn in 1634. In the meantime he was instituted to the vicarage of Stanwell in Middlesex, where he made a name by his preaching; he obtained in September 1628 the additional benefice of St. Martin-le-Vintry. About 1640 he became chaplain to Charles I. The inhabitants of Stanwell petitioned against him in July 1642: he was deprived of his benefices, and a parliamentary preacher appointed. He was expelled with his family, but sheltered by Lord Arundell at Wardour Castle. A patent of June 1646 created him dean of Chichester, but he remained dependent on charity at Shafton in Dorset until after 1649, when he made at least one journey abroad, bearing to Charles II some money which had been collected among his adherents.

At the Restoration he was in July 1660 installed dean of Chichester and master of the hospital there; he was also sworn chaplain-in-ordinary to the king, and appointed dean of Windsor (and Wolverhampton), being installed on 3 September 1660. He became scribe of the order of the Garter the following January. As administrator of the charity of the poor knights of Windsor, he had to deal with the appeals of decayed royalists.

He was presented to the rectories of Haseley, Oxfordshire, and Acton, in Middlesex. In January 1662, when there was unseasonable hot weather, he preached to the House of Commons at St. Margaret's, on Joshua vii. 12, showing how the neglect of exacting justice on offenders was a cause of God's punishing a land. Practising what he preached, he had his curate at Acton harass Richard Baxter, who was drawing large audiences in defiance of the conventicle act. Baxter was eventually imprisoned for six months, causing Ryves damage with a reputation as embittered.

Ryves died at Windsor on 13 July 1677, and was buried in the south aisle of St. George's Chapel. By his wife, Kate, daughter of Sir Richard Waldram, knt., of Charley, Leicestershire, he had several children.

== Works ==
Besides sermons, Ryves was the author of Mercurius Rusticus; or the Countries Complaint of the Barbarous Outrages committed by the Sectaries of this late flourishing Kingdom. Nineteen numbers appeared from June to December 1643, and were republished together, in 1646, 1647, and 1685. George Wither started a parliamentary Mercurius Rusticus as a counter. The assaults on Sir John Lucas's house, Wardour Castle, and other mansions are narrated, while a second part starts on the damage done to the cathedrals. The intention was to scare the reader with the brutality of parliamentary troopers. It was frequently bound up, under the common title of Angliae Ruina, with the Querela Cantabrigiensis of John Barwick.

Ryves assisted Brian Walton in his work on the London tithes, and contributed to his polyglot bible.
