= Chief Medical Officer (Ireland) =

Health advisor to the government of Ireland

Chief Medical Officer of Ireland
- Príomh-Dhochtúir Oifigiúil na hÉireann
- Incumbent; Mary Horgan since June 2024
- Department of Health
- Abbreviation: CMO
- Reports to: Minister for Health
- Appointer: Government of Ireland
- Inaugural holder: Dr James Deeny
- Formation: 1944
- Deputy: Vacant
- Website: www.gov.ie/health/

The Chief Medical Officer (CMO) (Irish: an Príomh-Dhochtúir Oifigiúil) for Ireland is the most senior government advisor on health-related matters. It is a government post as the lead medical expert in the Department of Health.

The key responsibilities of the CMO include providing expert medical evidence, especially in public health matters, as well as leading on patient safety issues, emergency planning and other areas.

== History ==
The Government of Ireland appointed Dr James Deeny as its first Chief Medical Adviser in 1944. He was succeeded by Dr Charlie Lysaght who changed the name of the role to its current title of Chief Medical Officer.

== List of office-holders ==
=== Chief Medical Adviser ===
- Dr James Deeny, 1944–1962
- Dr Charlie Lysaght, 1962–1965

=== Chief Medical Officer ===
- Dr Jim Kiely, 1997–2008
- Dr Tony Holohan, 2008–2022
- Dr Ronan Glynn (acting), July–October 2020
- Professor Breda Smyth, November 2022–May 2024

=== Deputy Chief Medical Officer ===
- Dr James Walsh, ?–1988
- Dr Tony Holohan, 2001–2008
- Dr Philip Crowley, 2008–2018
- Dr Ronan Glynn, 2018–2022
- Professor Philip Dodd 2024–

== See also ==
- Chief Medical Officer (United Kingdom)
- Chief Public Health Officer of Canada
- Medical Officer for Health
