= COVID-19 testing in the Republic of Ireland =

Testing for COVID-19 in the Republic of Ireland

COVID-19 testing in the Republic of Ireland can identify whether a person is infected with SARS-CoV-2, the virus which causes COVID-19. The developing and delivering of testing of Ireland was led by the staff in the National Virus Reference Laboratory. With the acquisition of the sequence of the virus, they used this to develop and validate in-house assays in advance of obtaining any commercial diagnostic kits. The NVRL played a vital role in the early detection of COVID-19 cases in Ireland, and began playing a vital role in the detection of new variants of COVID-19 in 2021.

== Military response ==
The military response to the pandemic, which included provision of naval vessels to support onshore testing in Irish cities, was known as Operation Fortitude and initially involved such ships as LÉ Samuel Beckett, LÉ George Bernard Shaw and LÉ Niamh (Dublin), LÉ Eithne (Cork), and LÉ William Butler Yeats (Galway). On 15 May, the Naval Service completed its mission and—having been involved in 6,000 tests—transferred its duties to the Army (also under Operation Fortitude); the Army had begun work at the Aviva Stadium the previous day (while ships such as the LÉ William Butler Yeats—by this time based in Dublin—returned to sea, the LÉ Eithne stayed in the city of Cork for purposes of storage and logistics, not testing).

== Testing centres ==
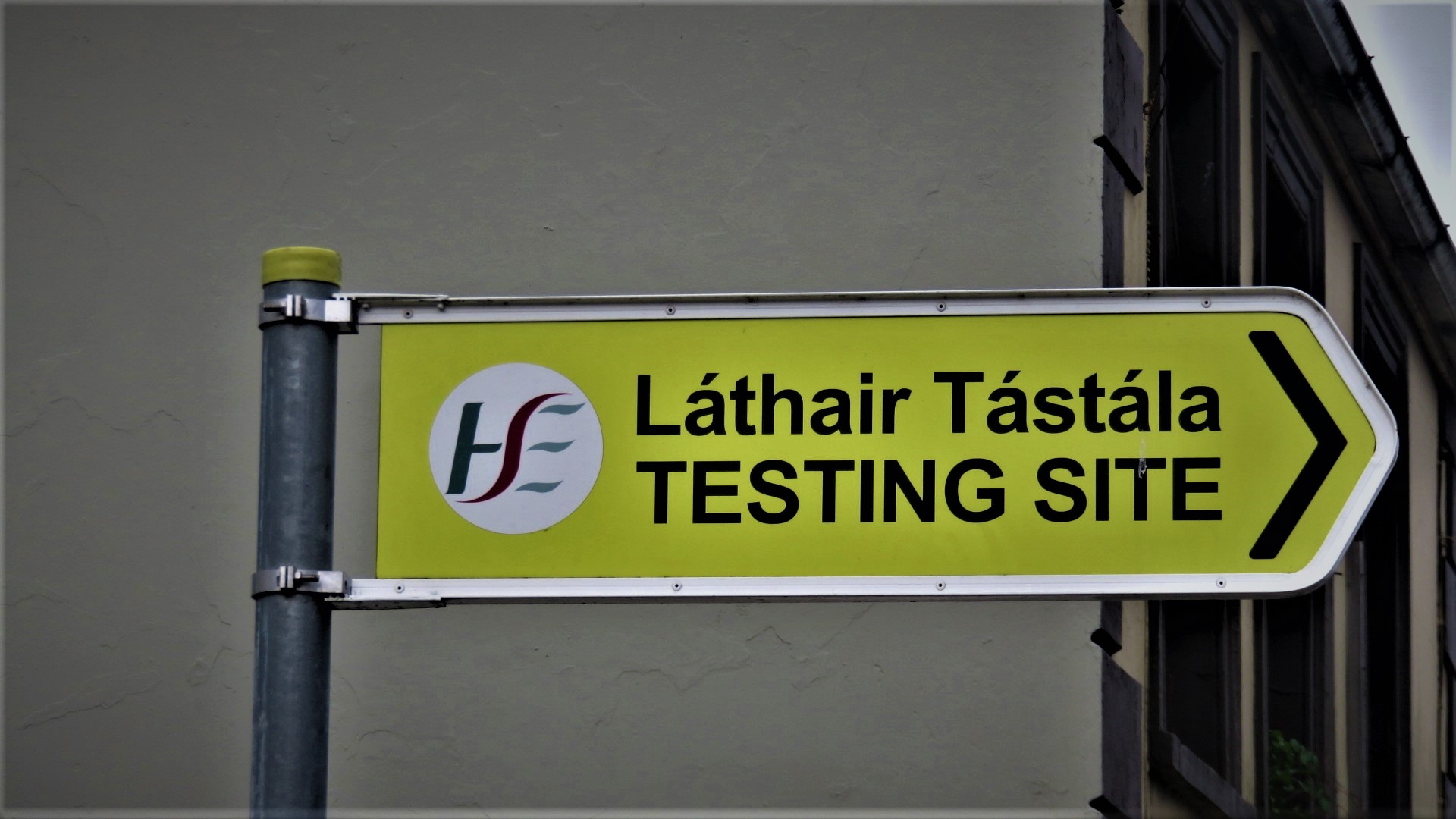
Bilingual English-Irish COVID-19 testing site directional finger post

Many Gaelic games stadiums were repurposed as drive-through COVID-19 testing centres. These included Croke Park in Dublin; Páirc Uí Chaoimh in Cork; Nowlan Park in Kilkenny; Gaelic Grounds in Limerick; MacHale Park in Castlebar; Breffni Park in Cavan; Tinryland GFC's facilities south of Carlow (later shut due to lack of demand); and O'Donnell Park in Letterkenny.

Among the other drive-through testing centres set up: St Vincent's in Athlone; the Lakeside Centre in Ballyshannon; Castlebar Leisure Complex in County Mayo; St Loman's Hospital in Mullingar; the Clarion Road in Sligo; Tallaght Stadium (the home ground of Shamrock Rovers Football Club) in Tallaght; a prefabricated HSE-owned building in Waterford near Cherrymount in Ballytruckle, which had been used by St Martin's Special School; the Whitemill Industrial Estate in Wexford.

Former testing sites which were later replaced by the local stadiums mentioned above include Ballyhaise Health Centre in Cavan and the disused St Conal's Hospital in Letterkenny.

Centres ranging from the counties of Cork (in the south) and Donegal (in the north) were shut at various times due to lack of testing kits.

On 24 March 2021, the Government of Ireland announced that five new walk-in COVID-19 test centres would open in Dublin and Offaly on 25 March in an effort to bring down cases that were high in certain areas. Nearly 1,700 people attended the five new temporary walk-in COVID-19 testing centres for people with no symptoms operated by the National Ambulance Service that opened in Dublin and Offaly on 25 March.

The temporary walk-in COVID-19 testing centres for asymptomatic people proved to be effective and was a success. Throughout March, April, May and June 2021, the Health Service Executive (HSE) set up more walk-in testing centres across the country. Centres were established in Dublin, Offaly, Meath, Westmeath, Kildare, Galway, Mayo, Limerick, Waterford, Tipperary and Louth. On 7 September, the HSE ceased walk-in testing nationwide to reduce queues at centres and called on people to book slots online as testing volume increased by 35%.

On 27 July 2022, a recommendation from Interim Chief Medical Officer Professor Breda Smyth that all Health Service Executive COVID-19 testing facilities be stood down from the autumn and to end free COVID-19 tests was accepted by Government.

== Timeline ==
After employees complained that the HSE were informing their employers of their results first and many people were first informed of their test outcome by their employer, the HSE said on 19 May that it would stop doing this.

On 23 March, around 40,000 people were waiting to be tested and the average wait time was 4 to 5 days. Minister for Health Simon Harris said that priority testing of only healthcare workers might have to be implemented.

On 25 March—to prioritise testing of healthcare workers—the threshold for requesting a COVID-19 test was narrowed. From then a person requesting a COVID-19 test had to: (i) be a healthcare worker; or (ii) present with a fever AND at least one other COVID-19 symptom.

From 28 April, testing criteria for the virus was broadened again to include anyone with one of the symptoms of fever, recent onset of cough or shortness of breath.

Results of a seroprevalence study, announced in July, conducted in counties Dublin and Sligo showed that about 1.7% of the population had been infected by SARS-CoV-2 with broadly similar infection rates between males and females and across different age groups. Results announced in October indicated that 18% of healthcare staff that volunteered to participate in a study at a large Dublin hospital, Tallaght University Hospital, showed antibody evidence of prior SARS-CoV-2 infection. This revealed a much higher seroprevalence in healthcare staff than in the general population.

On 22 June 2021, an online booking system for COVID-19 test referral opened for people in all counties.

On 22 February 2022, it was announced that COVID-19 testing would be scaled back after the Government agreed to end almost all remaining restrictions from 28 February.

== Problems with COVID-19 testing ==
Problems with testing kit availability and the global shortage in one of three reagents necessary to complete testing for the virus (namely that used in the second stage, extraction) became pronounced. New equipment was brought into the country from overseas. Two additional laboratories began testing for the virus in mid-April: the Enfer facility in Naas, County Kildare, and the Department of Agriculture, Food and the Marine's laboratory in Backweston. On 10 April, the HSE and the UCD-based National Virus Reference Laboratory announced a contract for enough reagent to complete 900,000 tests, though Director of the National Virus Reference Laboratory Cillian de Gascun said it was not the reagent that was used in the third stage of testing and thus, already amply supplied. The materials, supplied by Genomics Medicine Ireland Limited (GMI), went to the Enfer laboratory. De Gascun also asserted at the same time as this announcement that he had "misspoken" the previous month if he had said tests would be increased by thousands "within days". Scientists based in a laboratory in Sligo began making two types of reagent for COVID-19 testing carried out in the northwest of the country.

On 2 January 2021, it was revealed that there were approximately 9,000 positive COVID-19 tests not yet logged on the HSE's IT systems, due to both limitations in the software; and lack of staff to check and input details, meaning there was an effective ceiling of approximately 1,700 to 2,000 cases that could be logged each day. This caused a huge spike in confirmed cases, which ranged from 3,000 and up to 8,200, being reported each day.

PCR testing centres continued to operate through Christmas Day and St Stephen's Day 2021, as demand for PCR tests surged. Demand for PCR tests remained "extremely high" after Christmas, which resulted in no appointments available across all 41 testing centres for a number of days. More than 20,000 cases were reported each day, but it was estimated that up to 500,000 people (10% of Irish population) could have truly contracted COVID-19.

== See also ==
- COVID-19 testing
