= George Ryves =

English academic administrator (c. 1562–1613)

George Ryves (c. 1562 – 31 May 1613) was an English academic administrator at the University of Oxford.

He was born in Dorset, second of the eight sons of John Ryves (1532–1587) of Damory Court near Blandford and Elizabeth Marvyn, daughter of Sir John Marvyn of Fonthill Gifford, Wiltshire, and his first wife Jane Baskerville. He came from a gifted clan: of his brothers, Sir Thomas Ryves was an acknowledged expert on maritime law, and another brother, Sir William Ryves, had a highly successful career as a Law Officer and High Court judge in Ireland. Bruno Ryves, Dean of Windsor was a cousin. His widowed mother made her home with George in New College, and died at a ripe age in 1609.

Ryves was educated at Winchester College, where he gained a scholarship aged 12 in 1574, and New College, Oxford, where he matriculated in 1579, graduating B.A. 1582, M.A. 1586, B.D. 1594, D.D. 1599.

In the church, Ryves became chaplain to the Bishop of Winchester and canon of Winchester Cathedral in 1598, and held the following livings:

- Rector of Blandford St Mary, Dorset (1589)
- Rector of Alverstoke, Hampshire (1591)
- Rector of Stanton St. John, Oxfordshire (1600)
- Rector of Colerne, Wiltshire (1606)
- Rector of Old Alresford, Hampshire (1608)

Ryves was elected Warden (head) of New College, Oxford, in 1599, a post he held until his death in 1613. During his time as Warden of New College, he was also Vice-Chancellor of Oxford University from 1601 until 1602.

Ryves was involved in the translation of the King James Version. Gustavus Paine notes that a letter from Thomas Bilson to Thomas Lake refers to Ryves as "one of the overseers of that part of the New Testament that is being translated out of Greek".

Academic offices
Preceded by Martin Culpepper	Warden of New College, Oxford; 1599–1613	Succeeded by Arthur Lake
Preceded by George Abbot	Vice-Chancellor of Oxford University; 1601–1602	Succeeded by John Howson
