= John Sterne (bishop of Dromore) =

Irish clergyman

John Sterne (1660–1745) was an Irish Church of Ireland clergyman, bishop of Dromore from 1713 and then bishop of Clogher from 1717.

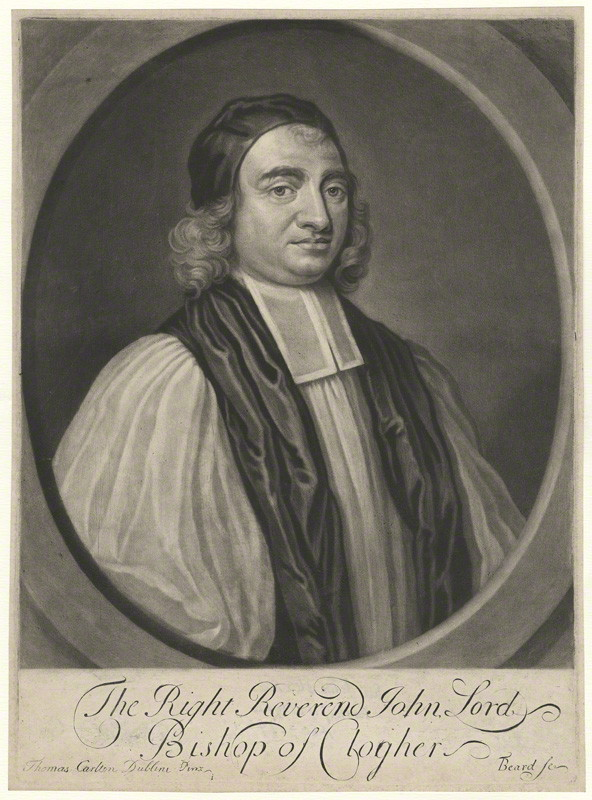
John Sterne

== Life ==
The only son of John Stearne, by his wife Dorothy, daughter of Charles Ryves (died 1700), examiner in the chancery of Ireland, he was born in Dublin. He was educated at the cathedral school under Mr. Ryder, and entered Trinity College, Dublin, on 2 April 1674, his tutor being Philip Barbour. He graduated B.A. 11 February 1677, M.A. 12 July 1681, and D.D. in July 1705.

Having been ordained deacon in October 1682 by Anthony Dopping, bishop of Meath, Sterne served for a time as his domestic chaplain. About 1688 he was made vicar of Trim, County Meath; in October 1692 he was instituted to the rectory of Clonmacduffe, and in June 1703 to that of Killary, both in the diocese of Meath. On 11 September 1702, he was installed chancellor in St Patrick's Cathedral. On the death of his mother's kinsman Jerome Ryves, Sterne was elected dean of St. Patrick's, by the chapter, with the support of Jonathan Swift, then prebendary of Dunlavin (Sterne, however, retained with the deanery the curacy of St. Nicholas Without, which Swift claimed had been promised to him). In July 1707 Sterne was instrumental in the election of Swift to represent the chapter in Convocation. Soon afterwards he joined a small social club to which belonged Swift, Stella, and their common friends, the Walls and the Stoytes, who met on Saturdays for cards and other diversions. Swift's letters during this period are full of allusions to Sterne.

When a vacancy occurred in the diocese of Dromore, Swift named Sterne to Bolingbroke and Ormonde. Ormonde raised difficulties, and Sterne had enemies among the Protestant clergy in Ireland; but Ormonde then gave way, so that Swift could have the deanery. Sterne was consecrated bishop of Dromore on 10 May 1713, and made a member of the Privy Council of Ireland in 1714. In March 1717, on the move of St. George Ashe to Derry, he was translated to Clogher. There, as at Dublin and Dromore, he was famed for hospitality, as Jonathan Smedley noted.

In 1721 Sterne was appointed vice-chancellor of Trinity College, to which in 1726 he presented a sum of £1,000 for a university printing house. In 1732 Sterne endorsed two bills: one for subdividing large preferments, the other for enforcing residence. Nothing came of them, but Swift wrote a devastating letter, dated July 1733.

Sterne died at Clogher, unmarried, on 6 June 1745.

== Legacy ==
Stearne's Estate Act 1771
- Act of Parliament
- Parliament of Ireland
- Long title: An Act to vest the estate of the Right Reverend Father in God, John Stearne, late lord bishop of Clogher, deceased, in trustees, in trust for carrying the charitable and other bequests of his will into execution.
- Citation: 11 & 12 Geo. 3. c. 5 Pr. (I)

Dates
- Royal assent: 2 June 1772

Other legislation
- Amended by: Stearne's Charities Act 1858

Stearne's Charities Act 1858
- Act of Parliament
- Parliament of the United Kingdom
- Long title: An Act to amend an Act of the Parliament of Ireland passed in the Eleventh and Twelfth Years of the Reign of King George the Third, intituled "An Act for vesting the Estate of the Right Reverend Father in God Doctor John Stearne, late Lord Bishop of Clogher, deceased, in Trustees, in trust for carrying the charitable and other Bequests of his Will into execution."
- Citation: 21 & 22 Vict. c. 10 Pr.

Dates
- Royal assent: 2 August 1858

Other legislation
- Amends: Stearne's Estate Act 1771

Text of statute as originally enacted

By his will, dated 13 May 1741, Sterne endowed a large number of local charities, especially Dr Steevens' Hospital and the Blue Coat Hospital, Dublin. He also left money to Swift's hospital for lunatics. He rebuilt the episcopal mansions at Dromore and Clogher, as well as St Patrick's deanery, and he left £1,000 to build a granite spire to St Patrick's Cathedral, in addition to funds towards finishing Clogher Cathedral. He left £50 per annum in exhibition to Trinity College, Dublin, poor scholars of the diocese of Clogher to have the preference.

The rarer books in his library he gave to Marsh's Library in Dublin. The remainder were distributed by lot among the poor curates of the diocese. His manuscripts, of which he had a significant collection, he bequeathed to Trinity College, Dublin; among them are the depositions of the sufferers in the Irish Rebellion of 1641.

== Works ==
Sterne's major work was Tractatus de Visitatione Infirmorum (Dublin, 1697; London, 1700, several editions). It was translated in 1840 as The Curate's Manual (London). The Tractatus was reprinted in the Clergyman's Instructor of 1807 and 1813; then in the 1843 edition it was replaced by Bishop Thomas Wilson's Parochialia.
