= Royal College of Physicians of Ireland =

Medical professional body

Coordinates: 53.34142°N 6.254748°W

- Coláiste Ríoga Lianna na hÉireann
- Motto: Ratione et experientia
- Motto in English: Reason and Experience
- Type: Medical royal college
- Established: 1654
- Affiliations: Academy of Medical Royal Colleges
- President: Professor Diarmuid O’Shea
- Location: No.6 Kildare Street (historic home)/ Frederick House, 19 South Frederick Street (administrative headquarter), Dublin, Ireland
- Vice President: Dr Pamela O'Connor
- Registrar: Professor Michael Keane
- Website: www.rcpi.ie

The Royal College of Physicians of Ireland (RCPI) (Irish: Coláiste Ríoga Lianna na hÉireann) is an Irish professional body dedicated to improving the practice of general medicine and related medical specialities, chiefly through the accreditation of physicians by examination.

== History ==
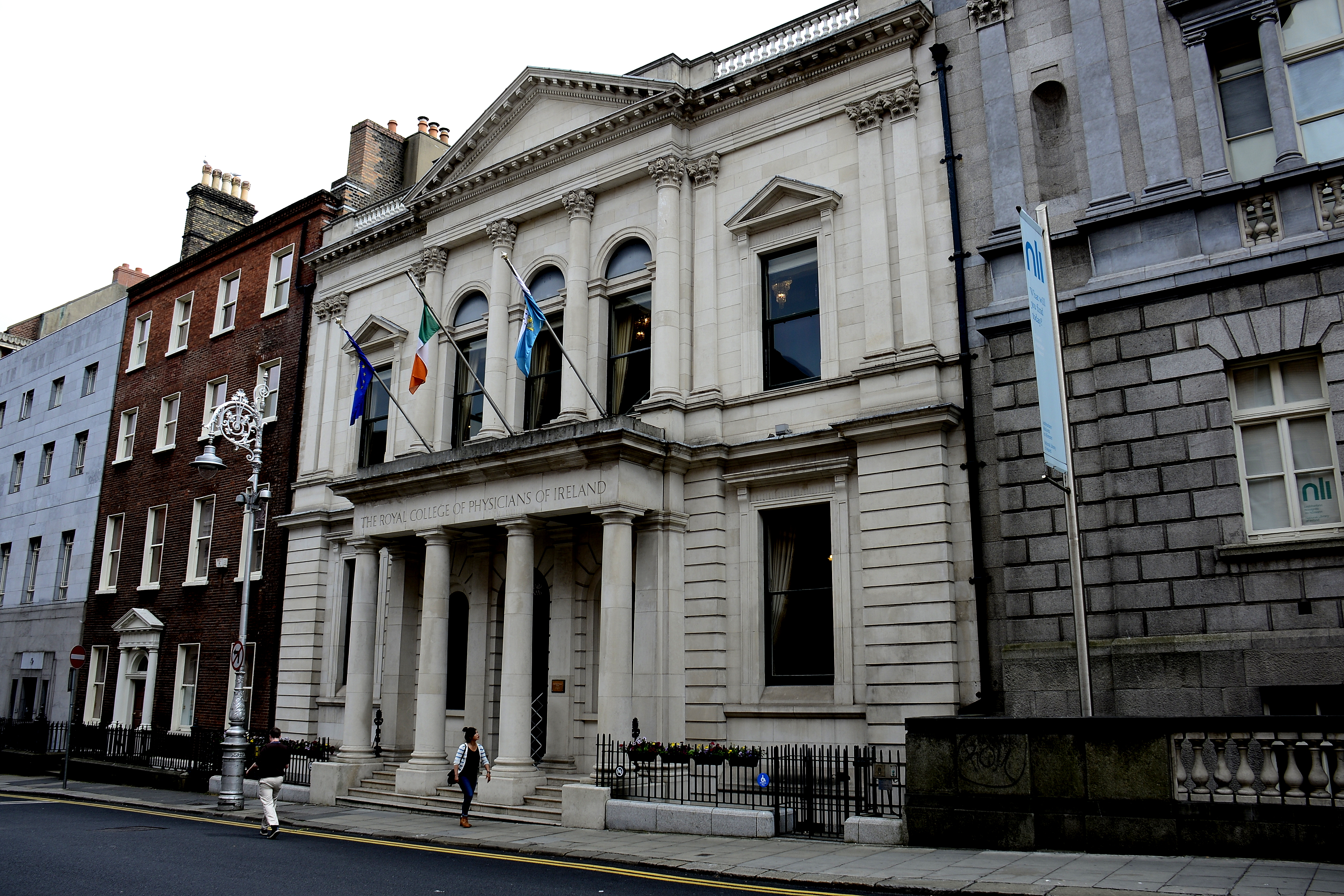
Heritage centre, No.6 Kildare Street, the historic home and conferencing venue of the Royal College of Physicians of Ireland

The "Royal" in the title comes from the royal charters that were granted in 1667, by King Charles II of England, and in 1692, by King William III and Queen Mary II of England. It was known as the King and Queen's College of Physicians in Ireland until 1890 when, under the charter of Queen Victoria, it adopted its present title.

The college was founded in 1654 by John Stearne, a professor and registrar of Trinity College Dublin, for the purpose of regulating the practice of medicine in Ireland. Originally, it was called "The Fraternity of Physicians of Trinity Hall", as its first home was in a building called Trinity Hall, given to the Physicians by Trinity College.

The royal charter of 1692 made the Physicians independent of Trinity College but meant that they had to leave Trinity Hall. They then had no permanent home until the opening of Sir Patrick Dun's Hospital in 1812, when the College established its headquarters in some rooms in the hospital.

In 1860, the college purchased the premises of the Kildare Street Club in Kildare Street. The building was destroyed in a fire in November 1860 and subsequently rebuilt by the college to its own design. It opened in 1864 and has remained the College's home ever since. Since 2011, the college premises have also housed the Apothecaries' Hall of Ireland, its activities, artefacts and archive.

The college library dates its foundation to 1713 when Sir Patrick Dun bequeathed his personal, large library to the college. The library has been known as "Dun's Library" ever since. Dun's Library forms part of the college's Heritage Centre, with the archive, heritage items, and genealogical research collections. The Heritage Centre holds one of the most important and extensive collections of printed, manuscript material and items relating to the history of medicine and medical education in Ireland.

As of the mid-1990s, the College was not open to the public "except by arrangement with the Secretary".

== Presidents ==
Among the famous past presidents of the College were William Fetherstone Montgomery, Sir Patrick Dun (1681–93), Bryan Robinson (1718, 1727, 1739), Henry Marsh (1841), Robert James Graves (1843), William Stokes (1849), and Sir Dominic Corrigan (1859–1863). James Little (1837–1916), who was president from 1886 to 1888, had worked as a ship's surgeon early in his career. He survived the shipwreck of the SS Ava in 1858, which is recorded in his diary, now held in the college's archives. In October 2017, Professor Mary Horgan was elected President of the College, the first woman to hold this post in the history of the College, and she was re-elected in September 2020 as the 142nd President (the first President to serve a second consecutive term since 1894).

== Membership and qualifications ==
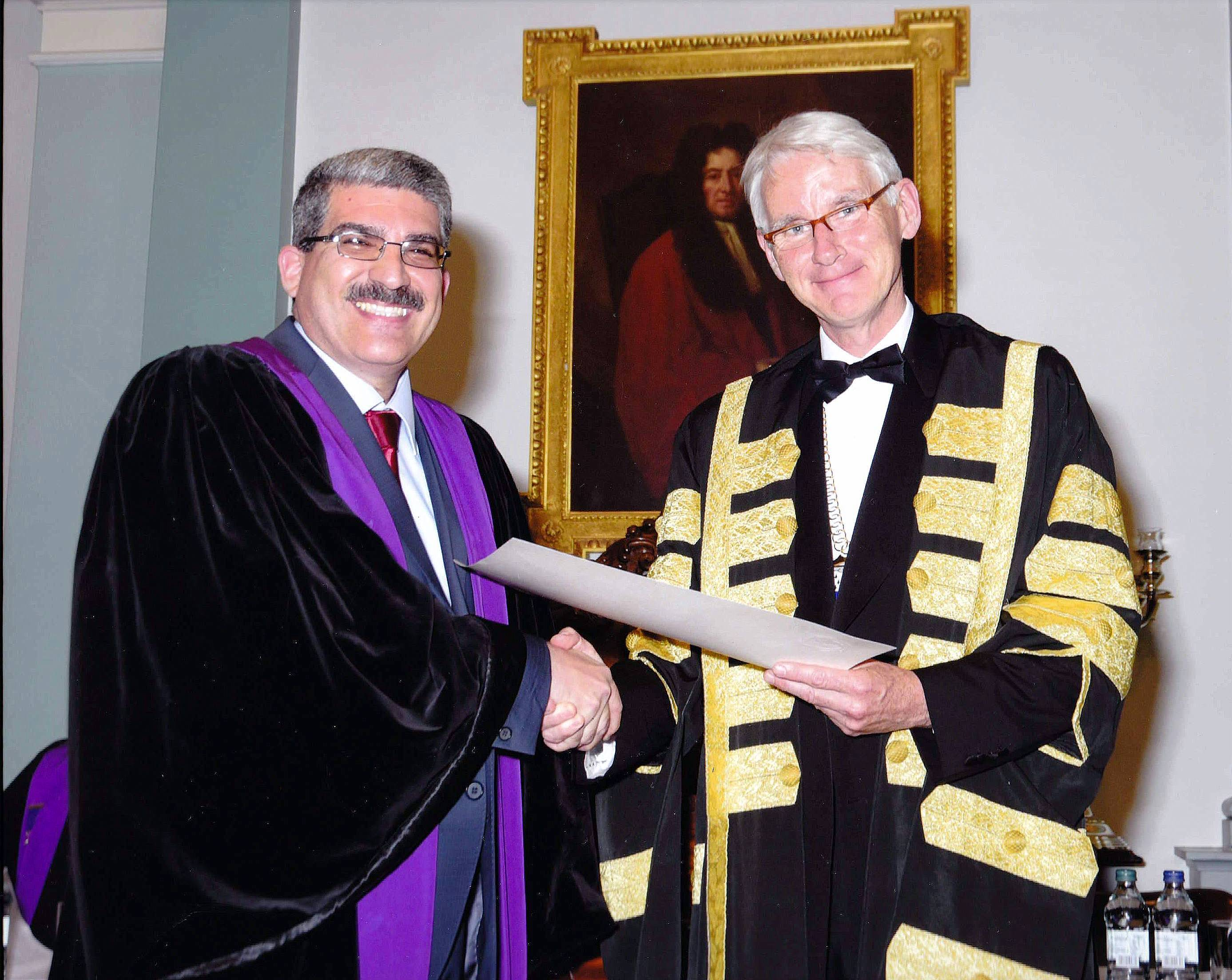
FRCPI, Fellowship admission ceremony at the Royal College of Physicians of Ireland, elevation from Membership (MRCPI). Dr. Frank Murray (then president of the College) appears with the Fellow

The college offers the postgraduate Membership of the Royal College of Physicians of Ireland (MRCPI) qualification. There is a separate and distinct Membership of the Royal Colleges of Physicians of the United Kingdom, the MRCP(UK) qualification, which is run by the Federation of Royal Colleges of Physicians of the United Kingdom (the Royal College of Physicians of Edinburgh, Royal College of Physicians and Surgeons of Glasgow, and Royal College of Physicians [of London]).

For several years, the college has been successfully conducting its MRCPI examinations in its overseas centres (Malaysia, Oman, India, Saudi Arabia, and Bahrain) in addition to many centres in Ireland. Membership is governed by the by-laws of the college. Every candidate wishing to obtain Membership of the Royal College of Physicians of Ireland must pass both parts of the Membership Examination (unless an exemption has been granted) and attend a Membership Conferring Ceremony where he/she is conferred as a Member of the Royal College of Physicians of Ireland. Membership confers the right to use the post-nominal MRCPI. On 30 March 2021, the College announced that the General Medical Council (GMC) of the United Kingdom has recognized five qualifications issued by the Royal College of Physicians of Ireland on their list of acceptable postgraduate qualifications for the purposes of full GMC registration.

Fellowship is awarded by the college upon nomination by two existing fellows (who should be in good standing with the college) to doctors of consultant or equivalent status. In 1915 the college updated the regulations to allow women to become fellows. The first woman to become a fellow was Mary Hearn in 1924. The benefits of this award include recognition of professional standing, access to Continuing Medical Education and Continuing Professional Development support, international collegiality, and the opportunity to influence the future of the profession. Fellowship of the Royal College of Physicians of Ireland (FRCPI) is an international benchmark of professional excellence, reserved for doctors who have made substantial contributions to their speciality and whose published works and attainments meet the high expectations of the College.

As of January 2022, the college has a total number of 14,098 members in good standing (who have paid their annual subscription fees) and in different membership categories. For instance, with respect to internal medicine (so-called members and fellows of the Royal College of Physicians of Ireland), there are 98 honorary fellows, 2,482 fellows, and 6,039 collegiate members. The Faculty of Pathology ranks second in the number of members, totalling 1,958 (97 honorary fellows, 583 collegiate members, and 1,278 associate members).

== Faculties & institutes ==
- Joint Faculty of Intensive Care Medicine of Ireland (in conjunction with the Royal College of Surgeons in Ireland, the College of Anaesthesiologists of Ireland, and the Intensive Care Society of Ireland)
- Faculty of Occupational Medicine
- Faculty of Paediatrics
- Faculty of Pathology
- Faculty of Public Health Medicine
- Faculty of Sports and Exercise Medicine (in conjunction with the Royal College of Surgeons in Ireland)
- Institute of Obstetricians and Gynaecologists
- Institute of Medicine (the newest one, established in 2020)

== Gallery ==
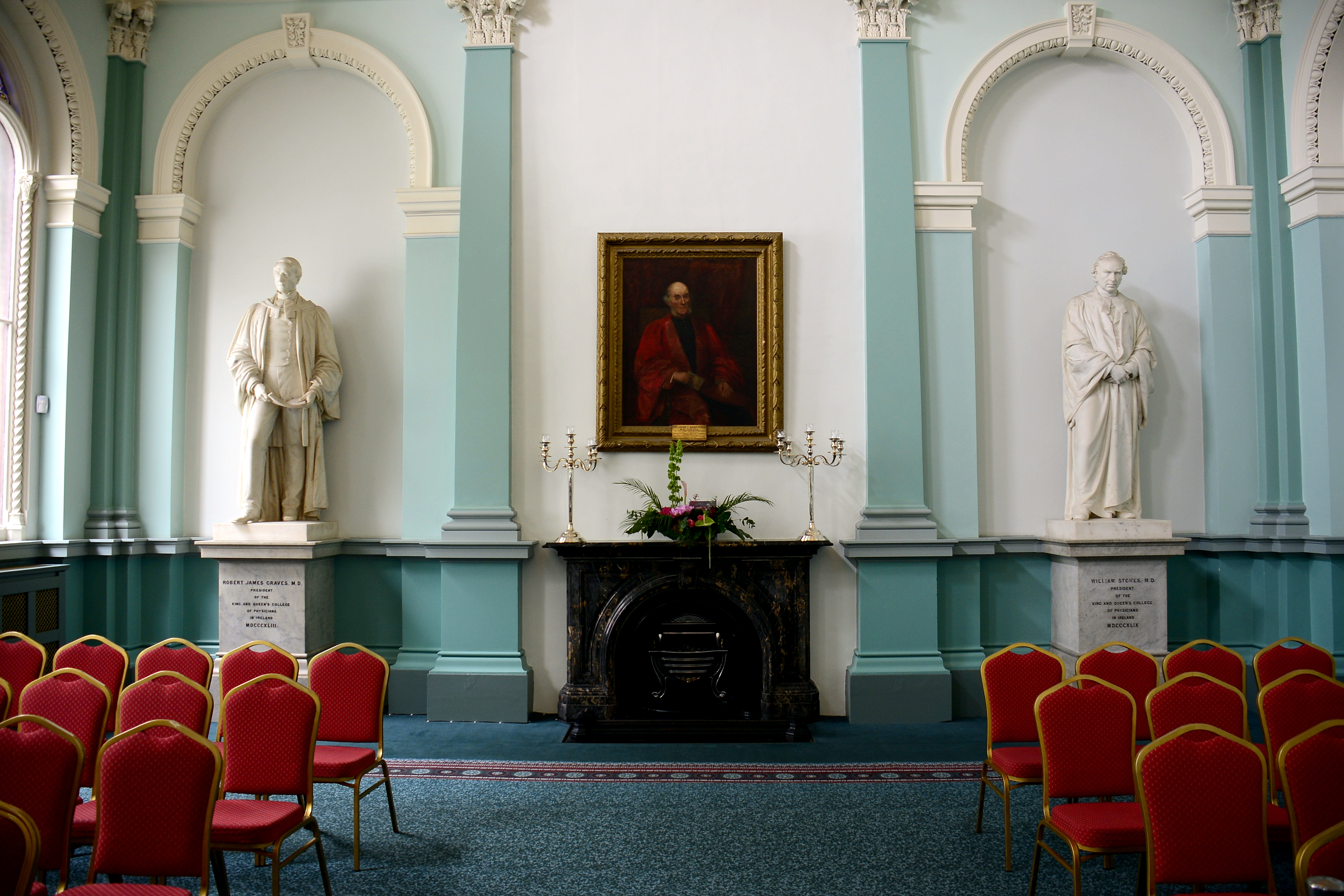
Graves hall at No.6 Kildare Street

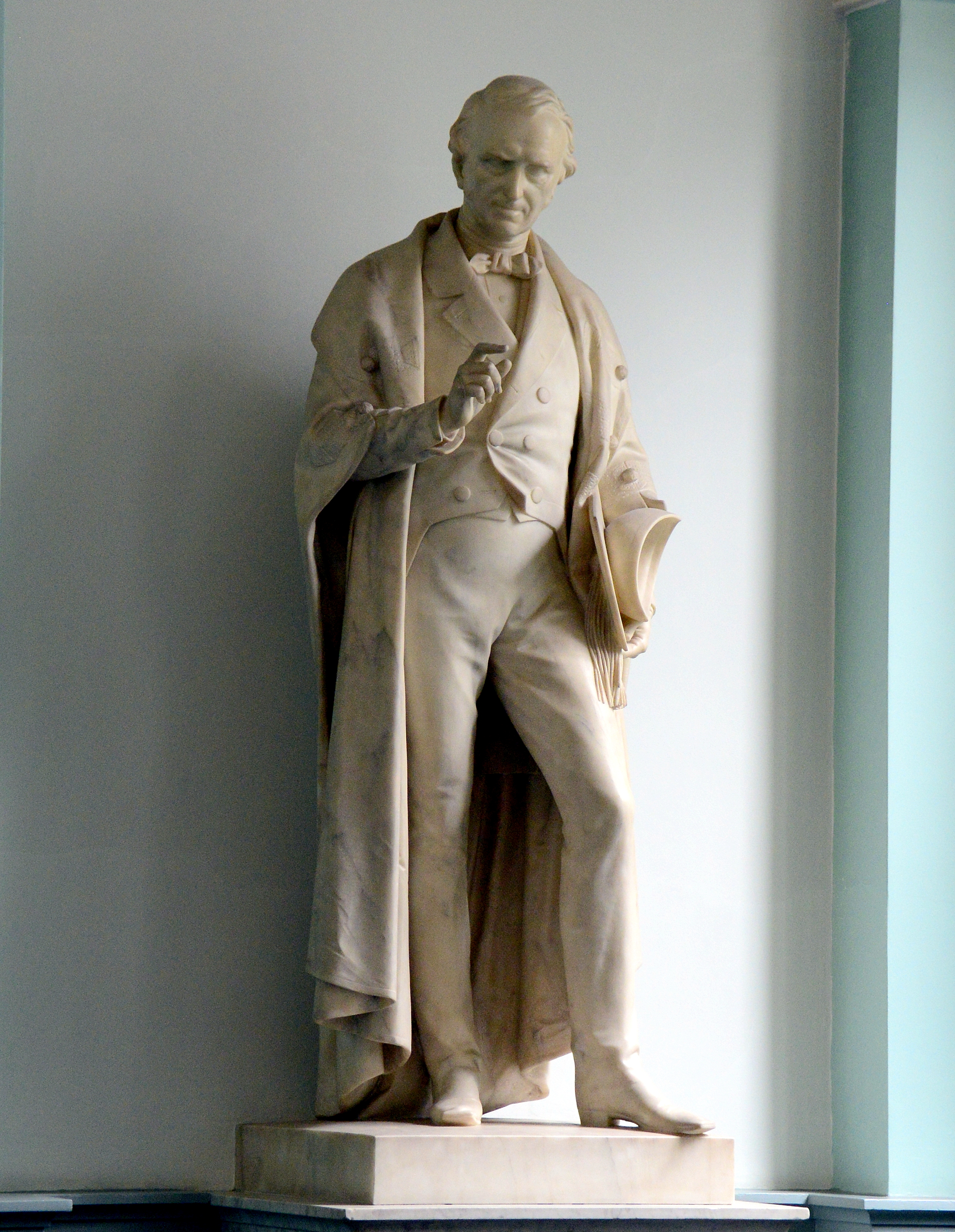
Marble statue of Sir Henry Marsh, former president of the College, the Graves hall at No.6 Kildare Street

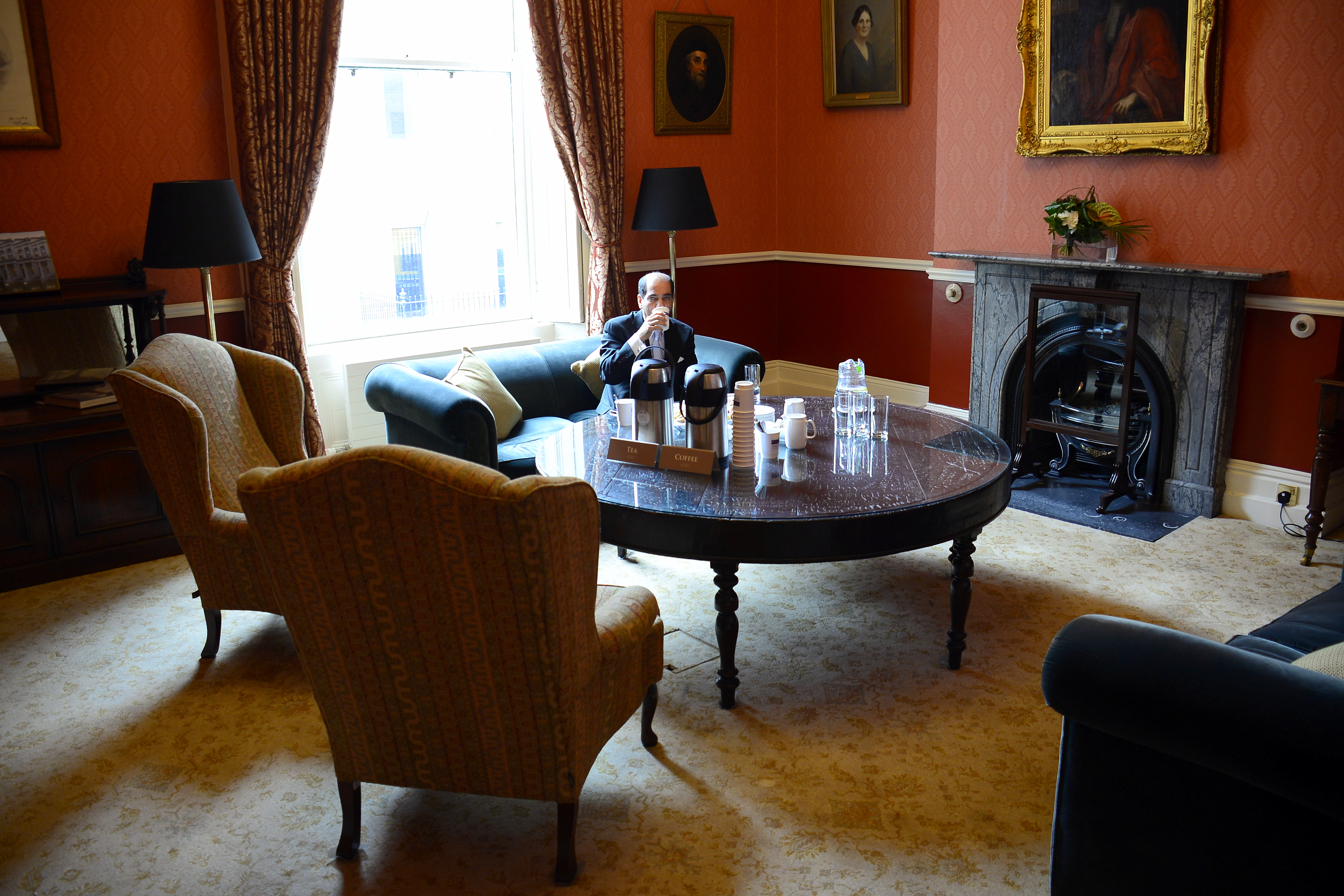
Stokes room at No.6, Kildare Street

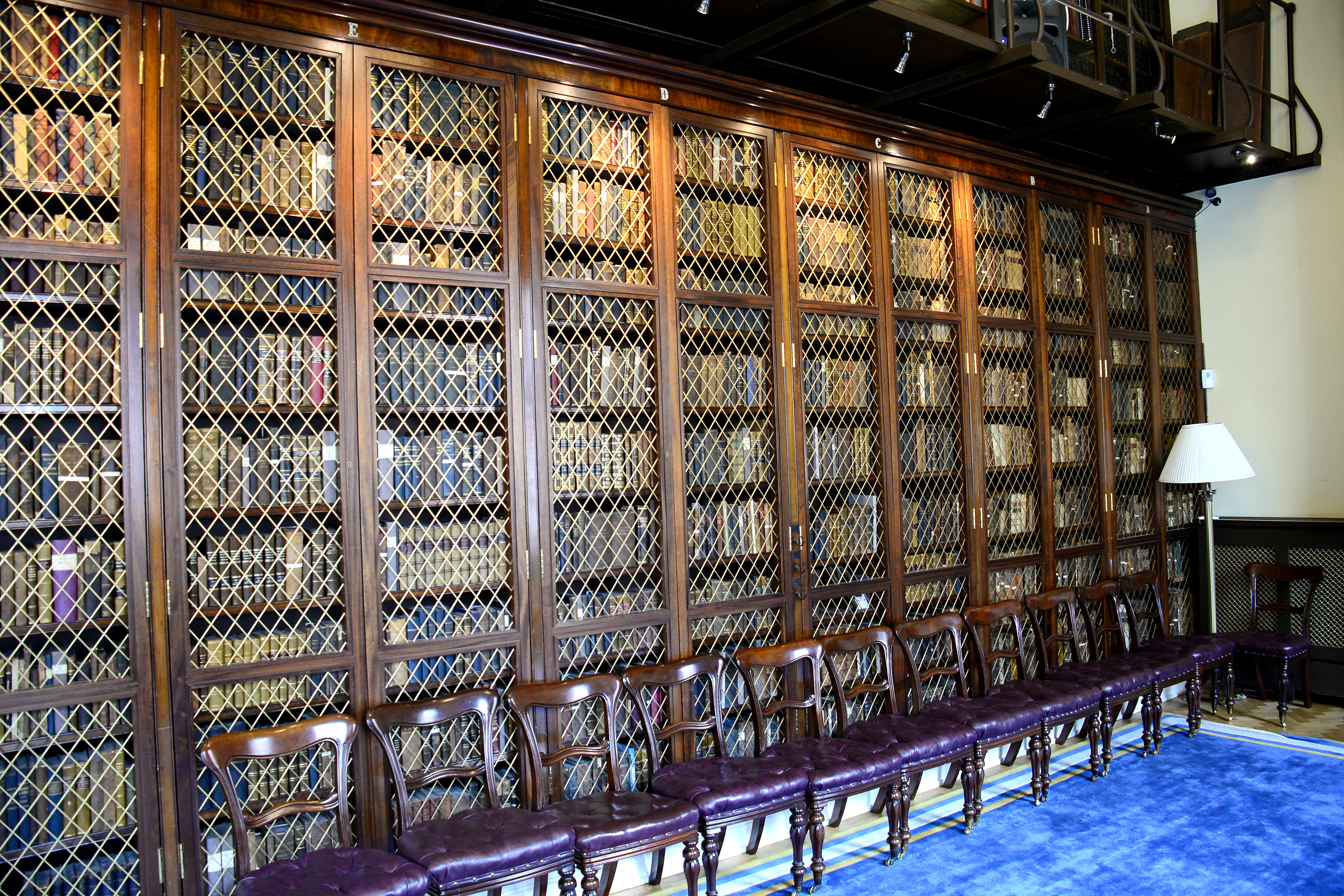
Dun's library at No.6 Kildare Street

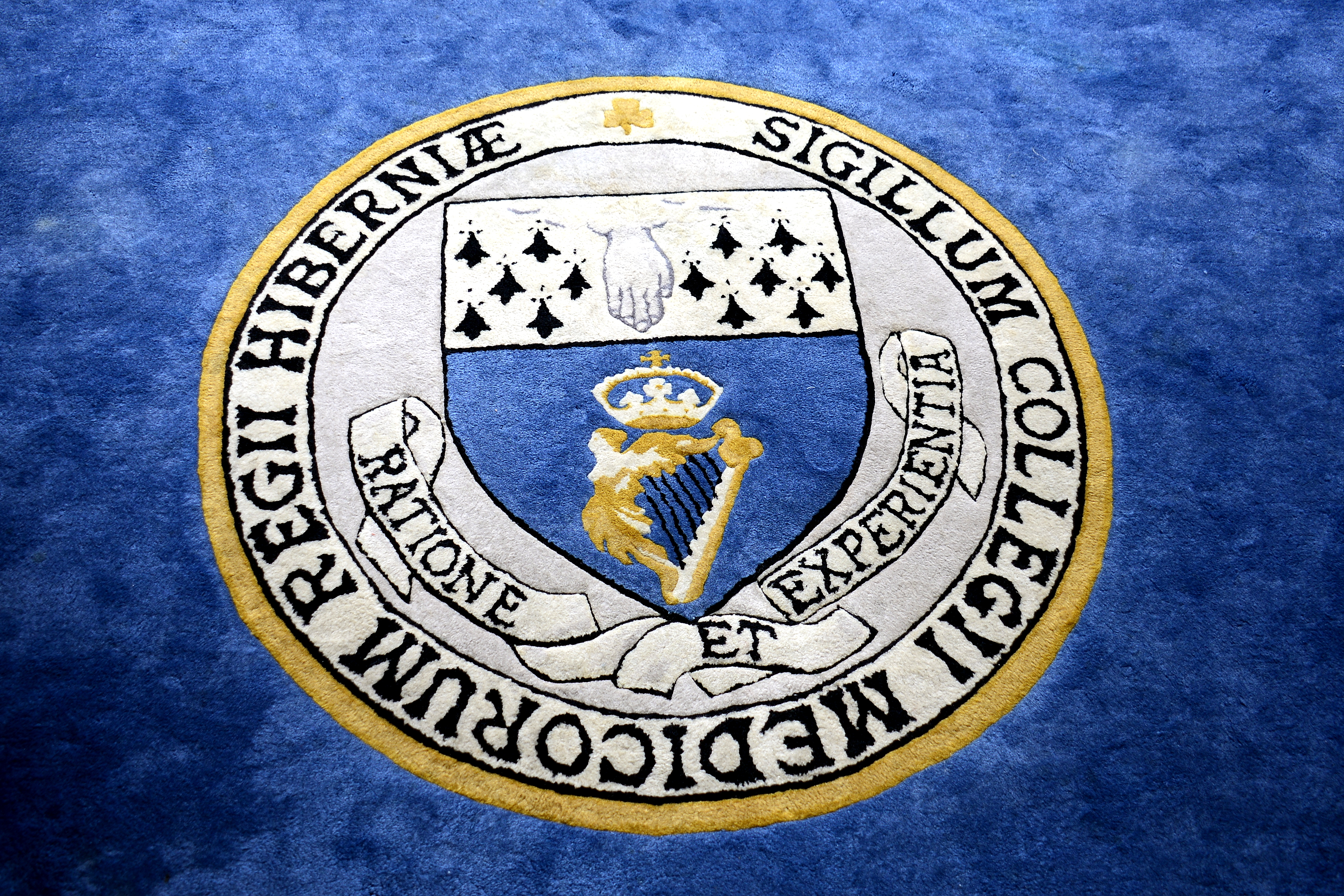
The coat of arms of the Royal College of Physicians of Ireland in Dublin, detail of a carpet at the Dun's library

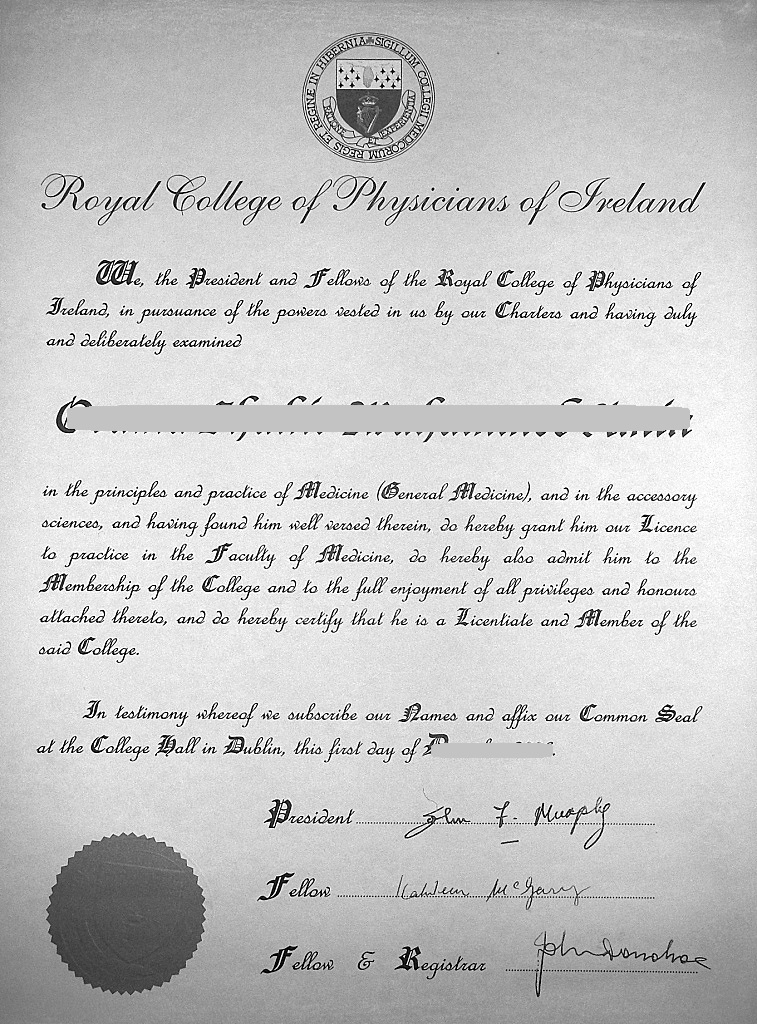
Membership diploma of the Royal College of Physicians of Ireland, MRCPI

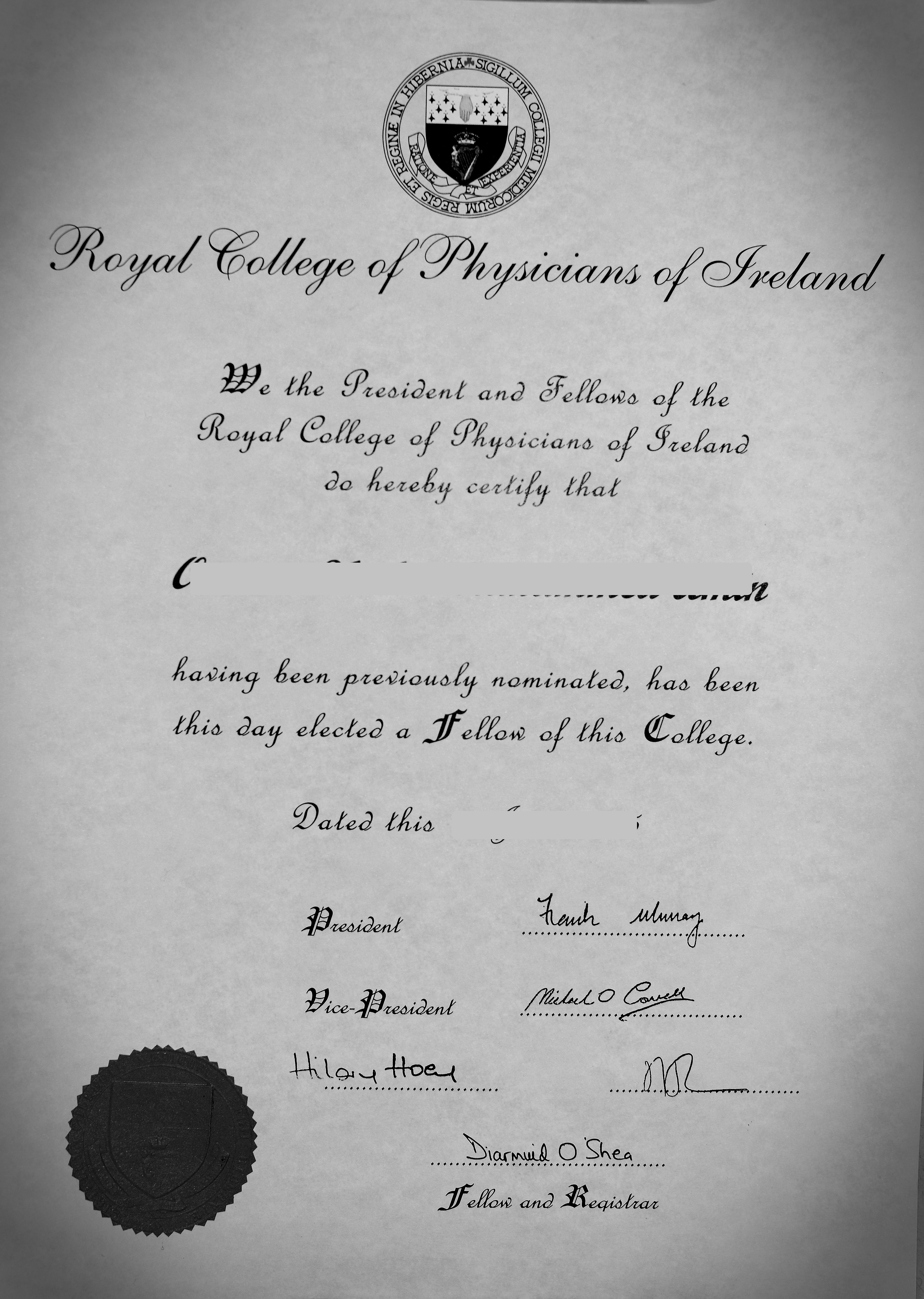
Fellowship diploma of the Royal College of Physicians of Ireland, FRCPI

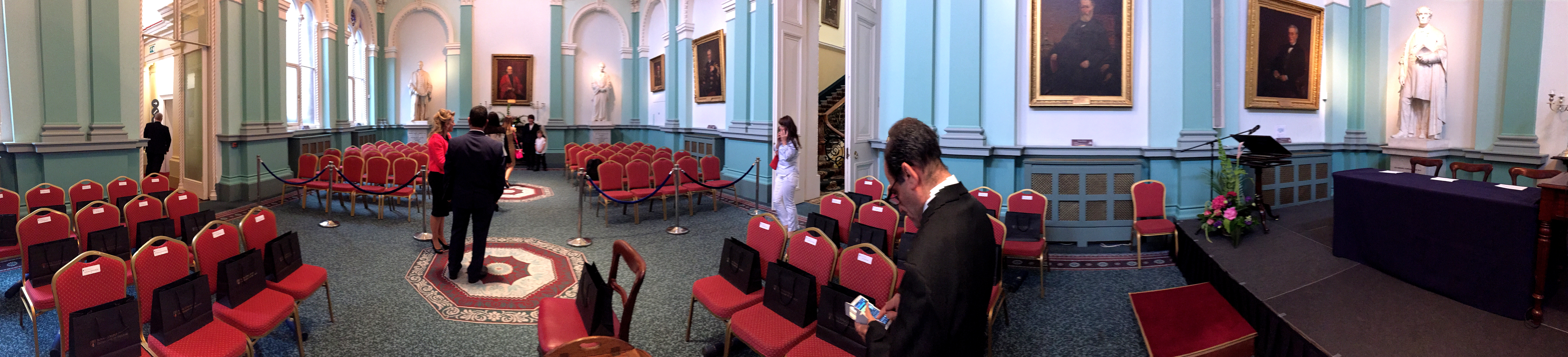
Fellowship admission ceremony at No.6 Kildare Street

== See also ==
- Royal College of Surgeons in Ireland
- List of presidents of the Royal College of Physicians of Ireland
