= List of chancellors and vice-chancellors of British universities =

This following is a current list of the chancellors, vice-chancellors and visitors of universities in the United Kingdom. The chancellor is the ceremonial head of a university, while the vice-chancellor is the chief academic officer and chief executive; some universities have only a vice-chancellor but no chancellor. A few universities use other titles for their ceremonial head, e.g., "president" at the Royal Agricultural University and "rector" at Brunel, University of London. Two English universities (UCL and Imperial) have chief executives who do not use the title vice-chancellor. In Scotland, the chief executive is titled the principal and vice-chancellor.

The visitor is appointed by the founder of a charitable institution to oversee the distribution of the founder's bounty; in the case of universities, this is often the sovereign, in which case the office is usually carried out by the Lord President of the Council. In general, only universities incorporated as chartered or statutory corporations have visitors, i.e. most pre-1992 institutions but not post-1992 universities. Where there is no provision for appointing a visitor in the charter of a chartered university, or if no visitor has been appointed, then the sovereign is the visitor. Scottish universities do not have visitors, nor do the two ancient universities of England, which are civil corporations.

== England, Wales and Northern Ireland ==
University	Chancellor	Vice-Chancellor	Visitor
Aberystwyth University	Dame Nicola Davies	Jon Timmis	(Appointed by the Privy Council)
Anglia Ruskin University	Bernard Ribeiro, Baron Ribeiro	Roderick Watkins	
Arden University		Carl Lygo (Note: Position titled Vice-Chancellor and Chief Executive Officer)	
Arts University Plymouth		Paul Fieldsend-Danks (Note: Position titled Vice-Chancellor and Chief Executive)	
Arts University Bournemouth		Lisa Mann	
Aston University	Jason Wouhra	Colin Grant	(Appointed by the Privy Council)
Bangor University	Sir Robin Williams	Edmund Burke	(No provision in charter)
University of Bath	Prince Edward, Duke of Edinburgh	Phil Taylor (Note: Position titled Vice-Chancellor and President)	Sir Barry Cotter (Appointed by Order in Council)
Bath Spa University	Sharanjit Leyl	Georgina Andrews	
University of Bedfordshire	Sarfraz Manzoor	Rebecca Bunting	
BIMM University		Olivier Robert-Murphy (Note: Position titled Chief Executive Officer and Vice-Chancellor)	
Birkbeck, University of London	Shami Chakrabarti, Baroness Chakrabarti (Note: Position titled President)	Sally Wheeler	(The King acting through the Lord President of the Council, or as appointed by Order in Council)
University of Birmingham	Sandie Okoro	Adam Tickell (Note: Position titled Vice-Chancellor and Principal)	Lord President of the Council
Birmingham City University	Ade Adepitan	David Mba	
Birmingham Newman University	Julie Etchingham	Jackie Dunne	
University College Birmingham		Michael Harkin	
Bournemouth University	Kate Adie	Alison Honour	
BPP University	Martyn W Jones	Tim Stewart	
University of Bradford	Anita Rani	Shirley Congdon	(No provision in charter)
University of Brighton		Donna Whitehead	
University of Bristol	Sir Paul Nurse	Evelyn Welch	Lord President of the Council
Brunel University of London	Dame Jocelyn Bell Burnell (Note: Position titled Rector)	Andrew Jones	(No provision in charter)
University of Buckingham	Dame Mary Archer	James Tooley	(No provision in charter)
Buckinghamshire New University	Vacant as of September 2024	Damien Page	
University of Cambridge	Chris Smith, Baron Smith of Finsbury	Deborah Prentice	
Canterbury Christ Church University	Archbishop of Canterbury (Sarah Mullally)	Rama Thirunamachandran	
Cardiff Metropolitan University	Stephen Wordsworth	Rachael Langford (Note: Position titled President and Vice-Chancellor)	
Cardiff University	Laura Trevelyan	Wendy Larner	Sir Anthony Evans (Appointed by the Sovereign-in-Council on the nomination of the chancellor of the university)
University of Chester	Dame Jenny Harries	Eunice Simmons	
University of Chichester		Symeon Dagkas	
City St George's, University of London	Lord Mayor of London	Anthony Finkelstein	(No provision in charter)
Coventry University	Eng Ahmed El Sewedy	John Latham	
Cranfield University	Dame Deirdre Hutton	Dame Karen Holford (Note: Position titled Chief Executive and Vice-Chancellor)	Prince Edward, Duke of Kent (Appointed by Order in Council)
University for the Creative Arts	Dame Magdalene Odundo	Melanie Gray and Mark Ellul	
University of Cumbria	Stephen Cottrell, Archbishop of York	Julie Mennell	
De Montfort University	Akram Khan	Katie Normington	
University of Derby	William Cavendish, Earl of Burlington	Kathryn Mitchell	
Durham University	Fiona Hill	Karen O'Brien (Note: Position titled Vice-Chancellor and Warden)	The Bishop of Durham, or a suffragan bishop during vacancies longer than four weeks (Rick Simpson)
University of East Anglia	Dame Jenny Abramsky	David Maguire	(Appointed by Order in Council)
University of East London	Aamer Sarfraz	Amanda Broderick	
Edge Hill University	Dawn Airey	Nick Braisby (Interim)	
University of Essex	Sarah Perry	Frances Bowen	(Appointed by Order in Council)
University of Exeter	Sir Michael Barber	Lisa Roberts	The Sovereign (Charles III)
Falmouth University	Dawn French	Emma Hunt	
University of Gloucestershire	Michael Bichard, Baron Bichard	Dame Clare Marchant	
Goldsmiths, University of London		Joanna Newman	(No provision charter)
University of Greater Manchester	George Windsor, Earl of St Andrews	Greg Walker (Interim)	
Harper Adams University	Anne, Princess Royal	Ken Sloan	
Hartpury University	Martin Clunes	Andy Collop (Note: Position titled Vice-Chancellor, Executive Principal and Chief Executive Officer)	
Health Sciences University	Anne, Princess Royal	Lesley Haig	
University of Hertfordshire	Grace Ononiwu	Anthony Woodman	
University of Huddersfield	Sir George Buckley	Bob Cryan	
University of Hull	Alan Johnson	Tom Lawson	Lord President of the Council
Imperial College London		Hugh Brady	Lord President of the Council
Keele University	Carol Shanahan	Kevin Shakesheff	Lord President of the Council
King's College London	Anne, Princess Royal (as Chancellor of the University of London)	Shitij Kapur	Vacant (appointed by Order in Council)
Kingston University		Steven Spier	
University of Lancashire	Ranvir Singh	Graham Baldwin	
Lancaster University	Alan Milburn	Steve Decent	The Sovereign (Charles III)
University of Leeds	Dame Jane Francis	Shearer West	Lord President of the Council
Leeds Arts University	Skin	Simone Wonnacott	
Leeds Beckett University	Sir Bob Murray	Peter Slee	
Leeds Trinity University	Deborah McAndrew	Charles Egbu	
University of Leicester	Dame Maggie Aderin-Pocock	Nishan Canagarajah	Lord President of the Council
University of Lincoln	Victor Adebowale, Baron Adebowale	Neal Juster	
Lincoln Bishop University	Tracy Borman	Andrew Gower	
University of Liverpool	Wendy Beetlestone	Tim Jones	Lord President of the Council
Liverpool Hope University	Monica Grady	Claire Ozanne (Note: Position titled Vice-Chancellor and Rector)	
Liverpool John Moores University	Nisha Katona	Mark Power	
University of London	Anne, Princess Royal	Wendy Thomson	The Sovereign acting through the Lord President of the Council
London Metropolitan University		Julie Hall	
London School of Economics		Larry Kramer	
London and South East University Group	YolanDa Brown	Jane Harrington	
London South Bank University	Sir Simon Hughes	Paul Kett	
Loughborough University	Sebastian Coe, Baron Coe	Nick Jennings	Paul Michell (Appointed by Order in Council)
University of Manchester	Nazir Afzal	Duncan Ivison	(Appointed by Order in Council)
Manchester Metropolitan University	Antony Jenkins	Malcolm Press	
Middlesex University	Dame Janet Ritterman	Shân Wareing	
Newcastle University	Imtiaz Dharker	Chris Day	The Sovereign (Charles III)
Norland University of Early Childhood		Janet Rose	
University of Northampton	Richard Coles	Anne-Marie Kilday	
Northeastern University – London		Rob Farquharson (Note: Position titled Chief Executive Officer)	
Northumbria University	George Clarke	Andy Long	
Norwich University of the Arts	Amma Asante	Ben Stopher	
University of Nottingham	Lola Young, Baroness Young of Hornsey	Jane Norman	Lord President of the Council
Nottingham Trent University	Sir John Peace	Dave Petley	
Open University	Martha Lane Fox, Baroness Lane-Fox of Soho	David Phoenix	(Appointed by Order in Council)
University of Oxford	William Hague, Baron Hague of Richmond	Irene Tracey	
Oxford Brookes University	Paterson Joseph	Helen Laville	
Plymouth University	Jonathan Kestenbaum, Baron Kestenbaum	Richard Davies	
Plymouth Marjon University	Nick McKinnel	Claire Taylor	
University of Portsmouth	Karen Blackett	Graham Galbraith	
Queen Mary University of London		Colin Bailey (Note: Position titled President and Principal)	The King acting through the Lord President of the Council, or as appointed by order in council
Queen's University Belfast	Hillary Clinton	Sir Ian Greer	(No provision in charter)
Ravensbourne University London		Jon Kingsbury	
University of Reading	Paul Lindley	Robert Van de Noort	Lord President of the Council
Regent's University London	Vacant	Geoff Smith	
Richmond American University London		Philip Deans	
Roehampton University	Sandip Verma, Baroness Verma	Jean-Noël Ezingeard	
Royal Agricultural University	King Charles III	Peter McCaffery	
Royal Holloway, University of London		Julie Sanders	(Appointed by the university council)
Royal Veterinary College		Stuart Reid	(No provision in charter)
University of Salford	Lucy Meacock	Nic Beech	(No provision in charter)
University of Sheffield	Dame Anne Rafferty	Koen Lamberts	Lord President of the Council
Sheffield Hallam University	Uriah Rennie	Liz Mossop	
SOAS University of London		Zeinab Badawi	King-in-Council (or as appointed by Order in Council)
Southampton Solent University	Theo Paphitis	James Knowles	
University of Southampton	Justine Greening and Kamlesh Patel, Baron Patel of Bradford	Charlie Jeffery	Lord President of the Council
University of South Wales	Rowan Williams, Baron Williams of Oystermouth	Ben Calvert	
Staffordshire University	Francis Fitzherbert, 15th Baron Stafford	Philip Plowden (Interim)	
St Mary's University, Twickenham	Cardinal Vincent Nichols	Anthony McClaran	
University of Suffolk	Helen Pankhurst	Jenny Higham	
University of Sunderland	Emeli Sandé	Sir David Bell	
University of Surrey	Prince Edward, Duke of Kent	Stephen Jarvis	(Appointed by Order in Council)
University of Sussex	Sanjeev Bhaskar	Sasha Roseneil	Lord President of the Council
Swansea University	Dame Jean Thomas	Paul Boyle	(Appointed by Order in Council)
Teesside University	Paul Drechsler	Paul Croney	
Ulster University	Colin Davidson	Paul Bartholomew	(No provision in charter)
University College London		Michael Spence (Note: Position titled President and Provost)	Master of the Rolls
University of the Arts London	Clive Myrie	Karen Stanton	
University of Law	David Neuberger, Baron Neuberger of Abbotsbury	Andrea Nollent	
University of Wales	King Charles III	Elwen Evans	Lord President of the Council
University of Wales, Trinity Saint David		Elwen Evans	Bishop of St David's or nominee (Joanna Penberthy)
University of Warwick	Bience Gawanas	Stuart Croft	(Appointed by Order in Council)
University of West London	Laurence Geller	Peter John	
University of the West of England (UWE Bristol)	Sir Peter Bazalgette	Sir Steve West (Note: Position titled Vice-Chancellor, President and Chief Executive Officer)	
University of Westminster	Natalie Campbell	Dibyesh Anand (interim)	
University of Winchester	Hugh Dennis	Sarah Greer	
University of Wolverhampton	Vacant	Ebrahim Adia	
University of Worcester	Prince Richard, Duke of Gloucester	David Green	
Wrexham University	Colin Jackson	Joe Yates	
University of York	Heather Melville	Ken Badcock (Interim)	(Appointed by Order in Council)
York St John University	Reeta Chakrabarti	Karen Bryan	

== Scotland ==
At Scottish universities, the chief executive is styled the principal (formally principal and vice-chancellor). The ancient universities of Scotland, and the University of Dundee, have a rector, elected by the student body.

University	Chancellor	Principal	Rector
University of Aberdeen	Queen Camilla	Peter Edwards	Iona Fyfe
Abertay University	Alice Brown	Liz Bacon	
University of Dundee	George Robertson, Baron Robertson of Port Ellen	Nigel Seaton (interim)	Maggie Chapman
University of Edinburgh	Anne, Princess Royal	Sir Peter Mathieson	Simon Fanshawe
Edinburgh Napier University	Will Whitehorn	Sue Rigby	
University of Glasgow	Dame Katherine Grainger	Andy Schofield	Ghassan Abu-Sittah
Glasgow Caledonian University	Anne-Marie Imafidon	Mairi Watson	
Heriot-Watt University	Vacant	Richard Williams	
University of the Highlands and Islands	Anne, Princess Royal	Vicki Nairn	
Queen Margaret University	Patrick Grant	Sir Paul Grice	
Robert Gordon University	Dame Evelyn Glennie	Steve Olivier	
University of St Andrews	Dame Anne Pringle	Dame Sally Mapstone	Stella Maris
University of Stirling	Jack McConnell, Baron McConnell of Glenscorrodale	Sir Gerry McCormac	
University of Strathclyde	Robert Smith, Baron Smith of Kelvin	Stephen McArthur	
University of the West of Scotland	Yekemi Otaru	James Miller	

== Long service ==
The vice-chancellors listed below have served in that capacity for 15 years or more at a British university, a constituent institution of a federal university, or an institution that achieved that status during their period in office. Italics indicate people currently in office as of January 2024.

47 Years: George Baird (Edinburgh 1793–1840).

43 Years: Sir Henry Reichel (Bangor 1884–1927).

36 Years: George Campbell (Aberdeen 1759–95).

35 Years: Duncan Macfarlan(Glasgow 1823–58), John Mackay (Dundee 1895–1930).

34 Years: Hector Boece (Aberdeen 1500–34), Thomas Hamilton (Queens Belfast 1889–1923), Sir Hector Hetherington (Liverpool 1927–36, Glasgow 1936–61).

33 Years: Neil Campbell (Glasgow 1728–61).

31 Years: Sir Emrys Evans (Bangor 1927–58), Sir James Irvine (St Andrews 1921–52), Charles Thorp (Durham 1831–62).

30 Years: William Robertson (Edinburgh 1762–92), Patrick Sharp (Glasgow 1585–1615).

29 Years: John Adamson (Edinburgh 1623–1652), Sir James Donaldson (St Andrews 1886–1915).

28 Years: Ellen Charlotte Higgins (Royal Holloway 1907–35), Thomas Roberts (Aberystwyth 1891–1919).

27 Years: Sir Isambard Owen (Armstrong College, Newcastle 1894–1909, Bristol 1909–21), John Stirling (Glasgow 1701–28).

26 Years: Sir Charles Evans (Bangor 1958–1984), George Smith (Aberdeen 1909–35).

25 Years: John Caird (Glasgow 1873–98), William Lake (Durham 1869–94), John Murray (Exeter 1926-51), Sir Albert Sloman (Essex 1962–87), John Strang (Glasgow 1626–51), Sir Aubrey Trotman-Dickenson (Cardiff 1968–93).

24 Years: Sir William Halliday (KCL 1928–52), William Leechman (Glasgow 1761–85).

23 Years: James Duff (Durham Colleges 1937–60), Medwin Hughes (Trinity University College 2000–2011, Lampeter 2009–11, UWTSD 2011–23, Wales 2011–23), David Green (Worcester 2003–present).

22 Years: Sir David Brewster (St Andrews 1837–59), Sir Thomas Holland (Imperial 1922–29, Edinburgh 1929–44), Lord Stopford (Manchester 1934–56), Dame Margaret Tuke (Bedford 1907–29), Edward Wright (Glasgow 1662–84).

21 Years: Bill Bevan (Cardiff 1966–87), Henry Charteris (Edinburgh 1599–1620), George Holmes (Bolton/Greater Manchester 2005–26), Geraldine Jebb (Bedford 1930–51), Sir Edward Ross (SOAS 1916–37), Tim Wheeler (Chester 1998–2019).

20 Years: Lord Butterworth (Warwick 1965–85), Sir Colin Campbell (Nottingham 1988–2008), Sir Alexander Carr-Saunders (London 1937–57), Sir Graeme Davies (Liverpool 1986–91, Glasgow 1995–2003, London 2003-10), David Latchman (Birkbeck 2003–2023), Sir John LeFevre (London 1842–62), Sir Donald MacAlister (Glasgow 1909–29), Sir Philip Morris (Bristol 1946–66), Sir Timothy O'Shea (Birkbeck 1998–2002, Edinburgh 2002–18), Sir Cyril Philips (SOAS 1956–76), Sir Frederick Rees (Cardiff 1929–49), William Taylor (Glasgow 1803–23), John Watson (St Andrews 1966–86).

19 Years: John Cater (Edge Hill 2006–2025), Lord Chilver (Cranfield 1970–89), Michael Driscoll (Middlesex 1996–2015), Thomas Edmonds (Aberystwyth 1872–91), Anthony Kelly (Surrey 1975–94), John Lee (Edinburgh 1840–59), Sir Oliver Lodge (Birmingham 1900–19), Sir Fraser Noble (Leicester 1962–76, Aberdeen 1976–81), Gerald Pillay (Liverpool Hope 2003–22), Sir Michael Sterling (Brunel 1990–2001, Birmingham 2001–09), Frank Thistlethwaite (East Anglia 1961–80), Sir Ralph Turner (SOAS 1937–56), Raymond Rickett (Middlesex 1972–91),

18 Years: William Beveridge (LSE 1919–37), Sir Derman Christopherson (Durham Colleges 1960–63, Durham 1961-78), Archibald Davidson (Glasgow 1785–1803), Ifor Evans (Aberystwyth 1934–52), John Viriamu Jones (Cardiff 1883–1901), Sir James Mountford (Liverpool 1945–63), Sir William Muir (Edinburgh 1885–1903), Sir Steve Smith (Exeter 2002–20), William Wishart (Edinburgh 1736–54),

17 Years: Sir Edward Appleton (Edinburgh 1948–65), Sir Michael Arthur (Leeds 2004–13, UCL 2013–21), Edith Batho (Royal Holloway 1945–62), Baroness Blackstone (Birkbeck 1987–97, Greenwich 2004–11), Dame Glynis Breakwell (Bath 2001–18), John Brooks (Wolverhampton 1998–2005, Manchester Met 2005–15), Brian Cantor (York 2002–13, Bradford 2013–19), Sir Samuel Curran (Strathclyde 1964–81), Lord Flowers (Imperial 1973–85, London 1985–90), Sir Alexander Grant (Edinburgh 1868–85), Sir Peter Gregson (Queens Belfast 2004–13, Cranfield 2013–21), Ernest Griffiths (Cardiff 1901–18), Bertrand Hallward (Nottingham 1948–65), Sir Martin Harris (Essex 1987–92, Manchester 1992–04), Frank Hartley (Cranfield 1989–2006), Hugh Nisbet (Heriot-Watt 1950–67), Sir Franklin Sibly (Reading 1929–46), Anthony Steel (Cardiff 1949–66), Geoffrey Sim (Sheffield 1974–91), Lord Sutherland (KCL 1985–90, London 1990–94, Edinburgh 1994–2002), Geoffrey Templeman (Kent 1963–80).

16 Years: Charles Bosanquet (King's College, Newcastle 1952–63, Newcastle 1963–68), Sir Charles Carter (Lancaster 1964–80), John Craven (Portsmouth 1997–2003), Frederick Crawford (Aston 1980-96), Sir Alfred Dale (Liverpool 1903–1919), Richard Davies (Swansea 2003–19), Sir David Eastwood (East Anglia 2002–06, Birmingham 2009–21), Sir John Kingman (Bristol 1985–2001), Sir Alan Langlands (Dundee 2000–09, Leeds 2013–20), Sir Jim McDonald (Strathclyde 2009-25), Sir Peter Noble (KCL 1952–68), Colin Riordan (Essex 2007–12, Cardiff 2012–23), Sir Adrian Smith (QMC 1998–2008, London 2012–18), Sir Michael Thompson (East Anglia 1980–86, Birmingham 1987–96).

15 Years: Sir Robert Aitken (Birmingham 1953–68), Thomas Barley (Glasgow 1858–73), Alfred Barry (KCL 1868–83), Dame Janet Beer (Oxford Brooks 2007–15, Liverpool 2015–22), Duncan Bunch (Glasgow 1460–75), Sir Bob Burgess (Leicester 1999–2014), Dame Janet Finch (Keele 1995–2010), Sir David Harrison (Keele 1979–84, Exeter 1984–94), Richard Jeff (KCL 1843–68), Sir Irvine Masson (Sheffield 1938–53), Malcolm McVicar (UCLan 1998–13), Sir Alec Merrison (Bristol 1969–84), Frank Morgan (Bath Spa 1997–2012), Lord Morris (Leeds 1948–63), Sir Howard Newby (Southampton 1994-2001, West England 2006–08, Liverpool 2008–14), Paul O'Prey (Roehampton 2004–19), Elizabeth Reid (Bedford 1849–64), Sir Charles Robertson (Birmingham 1923–38), David VandeLinde (Bath 1992–2001, Warwick 2001–06), Sir Charles Wilson (Glasgow 1961–76),

== Lists of chancellors and rectors by university ==
- Chancellor of the University of Aberdeen
- Rector of the University of Aberdeen
- Chancellor of Bangor University
- List of chancellors of the University of Cambridge
- Rector of the University of Dundee
- List of chancellors of Durham University
- Chancellor of the University of Edinburgh
- Rector of the University of Edinburgh
- Chancellor of the University of Glasgow
- Rector of the University of Glasgow
- List of chancellors of the University of Oxford
- List of chancellors of the Queen's University Belfast
- Chancellor of the University of St Andrews
- Rector of the University of St Andrews

== Lists of vice-chancellors and principals by university ==
- List of principals of the University of Aberdeen
- List of principals and vice-chancellors of Bangor University
- List of vice-chancellors of the University of Cambridge
- List of vice-chancellors and wardens of Durham University
- List of principals of the University of Edinburgh
- Vice-chancellors of the University of Exeter
- Principal of the University of Glasgow
- List of vice-chancellors of the University of London
- List of vice-chancellors of the University of Oxford
- List of vice-chancellors of the Queen's University Belfast
- List of vice-chancellors of the University of Sheffield
- Principal of the University of St Andrews
- List of vice-chancellors of the University of Wales, Trinity Saint David

== See also ==
- Lists of university leaders
