= 1866 in the United Kingdom =

Events from the year 1866 in the United Kingdom.

== Incumbents ==
- Monarch – Victoria
- Prime Minister – John Russell, 1st Earl Russell (Liberal) (until 28 June); Edward Smith-Stanley, 14th Earl of Derby (Conservative) (starting 28 June)

== Events ==
- 1 January – London Fire Brigade is formed as The Metropolitan Fire Brigade.
- 12 January
  - Royal Aeronautical Society is formed as 'The Aeronautical Society of Great Britain' in London, the world's oldest such society.
  - Auxiliary steamer SS London (1864) sinks in a storm in the Bay of Biscay on passage from Gravesend to Australia with the loss of 244 people and only 19 survivors.
- 11 May – London bank Overend, Gurney and Company collapses precipitating a financial crisis.
- 18 June – Lord Russell loses a vote of no confidence against his government.
- 26 June – Lord Russell resigns as Prime Minister, following splits in the Liberal Party over parliamentary reform. The Earl of Derby takes over, leading a minority Conservative administration.
- July – Elizabeth Garrett Anderson opens the St Mary's Dispensary in the Marylebone district of London where women can seek medical advice from exclusively female practitioners.
- 2 July – The Yorkshire Post first published as a daily newspaper in Leeds.
- 5 July – marriage of Princess Helena, third daughter of Queen Victoria, to Prince Christian of Schleswig-Holstein at Windsor.
- 23 to 25 July – demonstrations in Hyde Park, London, in favour of parliamentary reform turn violent.
- 27 July – the SS Great Eastern successfully completes laying the transatlantic telegraph cable between Valentia Island, Ireland and Heart's Content, Newfoundland, permanently restoring a communications link.
- end July – W. G. Grace scores 224 not out for the England cricket team against Surrey at the Oval, just after his 18th birthday.
- 1 August – the National Olympian Association (promoted by John Hulley of Liverpool and Dr William Brookes of the Wenlock Olympian Society Annual Games) stages the first National Olympian Games field events at The Crystal Palace in South London. W. G. Grace wins the 440 yards hurdles.
- 6 September – the Great Tea Race of 1866 ends in London, narrowly won by the clipper ship Taeping.
- September
  - General Post Office begins erection of hexagonal pillar boxes to the design of John Penfold.
  - The song Hen Wlad Fy Nhadau – to become the official national anthem of Wales – is sung for the first time at the National Eisteddfod of Wales held at Chester.
- 4 December – the London Conference of 1866 opens to finalise agreements for Canadian Confederation in 1867.
- 12 December – the Oaks explosion in the Barnsley seam in Yorkshire kills 361 coal miners; a subsidiary explosion the following day kills 27 rescuers. This is the all-time worst colliery or mining disaster in England, and the worst mining accident in the U.K. until 1913.

=== Undated ===
- The last cholera epidemic in London causes over 5,000 deaths.
- Invention of the clinical thermometer by Thomas Clifford Allbutt.
- John Langdon Down describes Down syndrome.
- Worcester College for the Blind Sons of Gentlemen opens as a boarding establishment in Worcester.
- Morris Chair introduced by William Morris.
- Cadbury's first sell cocoa for drinking.
- Colman's mustard receives a Royal Warrant.
- General Post Office writes to all urban householders without a front door letter box urging them to provide one.
- The Society of St. John the Evangelist ("Cowley Fathers") is founded by Richard Meux Benson at Cowley, Oxford, the first stable Anglican religious order for men since the Reformation.
- John Graham Chambers founds the Amateur Athletic Club, drawing up rules for athletic competition.

== Publications ==
- George Eliot's novel Felix Holt, the Radical.
- Mrs Oliphant's novel Miss Marjoribanks.
- John Robert Seeley's controversial and anonymous work Ecce Homo: A Survey in the Life and Work of Jesus Christ.
- Hesba Stretton's children's story Jessica's First Prayer serialised in Sunday at Home; as a book, it sells one and half million copies.
- A. C. Swinburne's Poems and Ballads.

== Births ==
- January – Edgar Philip Perman, chemistry professor (died 1947)
- 16 January – Percy Pilcher, inventor and pioneer aviator (died 1899)
- 10 March – Amanda Aldridge, opera singer, teacher and composer (died 1956)
- 17 April – Ernest Starling, physiologist (died 1927)
- 24 February – Arthur Pearson, newspaper publisher (died 1921)
- 16 March – E. K. Chambers, literary scholar (died 1954)
- 26 March – Fred Karno, born Frederick Westcott, music hall impresario (died 1941)
- 7 June – Ernest William Hornung, author (died 1921)
- 26 June – George Herbert, 5th Earl of Carnarvon, financier of Egyptian excavations (died 1923)
- 28 July – Beatrix Potter, children's author and illustrator (died 1943)
- 21 September – H. G. Wells, writer (died 1946)
- 2 October – Charles Ricketts, designer (died 1931)
- 12 October – Ramsay MacDonald, Prime Minister (died 1937)
- 8 November – Herbert Austin, 1st Baron Austin, car designer (died 1941)
- 11 November – Martha Annie Whiteley, chemist and mathematician (died 1956)
- 30 November – Robert Broom, paleontologist (died 1951)
- 3 December – Ethna Carbery, born Anna Johnston, Irish poet (died 1902)
- 11 December – Jack Southworth, footballer (died 1956)

== Deaths ==
- 19 January – Harriet Ludlow Clarke, wood engraver and stained glass artist
- 23 January – Thomas Love Peacock, satirical novelist (born 1785)
- 27 January – John Gibson, sculptor (born 1790)
- 6 March
  - Sir William Gore Ouseley, diplomat (born 1797)
  - William Whewell, scientist, philosopher and historian of science (born 1794)
- 21 March – Charles Henry Cooper, antiquarian (born 1808)
- 29 March – John Keble, churchman (born 1792)
- 1 April – Elizabeth Jesser Reid, social reformer, promoter of women's higher education (born 1789)
- 4 April – William Dick, Scottish veterinary surgeon (born 1793)
- 5 April – Thomas Hodgkin, physician (born 1798)
- 12 April – Sir Peter Hesketh-Fleetwood, poliltician and developer (born 1801)
- 21 April – Jane Welsh Carlyle, writer (born 1801)
- 5 August – Henry William-Powlett, 3rd Baron Bayning, peer and clergyman (born 1797)
- 21 August – George Shillibeer, coachbuilder (born 1797)
- 10 September – David Ramsay Hay, interior decorator (born 1798)
- 30 November – Elizabeth Neesom, Chartist and women's rights advocate
- 1 December – Sir George Everest, geodesist (born 1790)
