= Andy Long =

Andy Long may refer to:

- Andy Long (rugby union)
- Andy Long (academic)

== See also ==
- Andrew Long, Australian geophysicist
