= Ernest Howard Griffiths =

British physicist

Ernest Howard Griffiths FRS JP
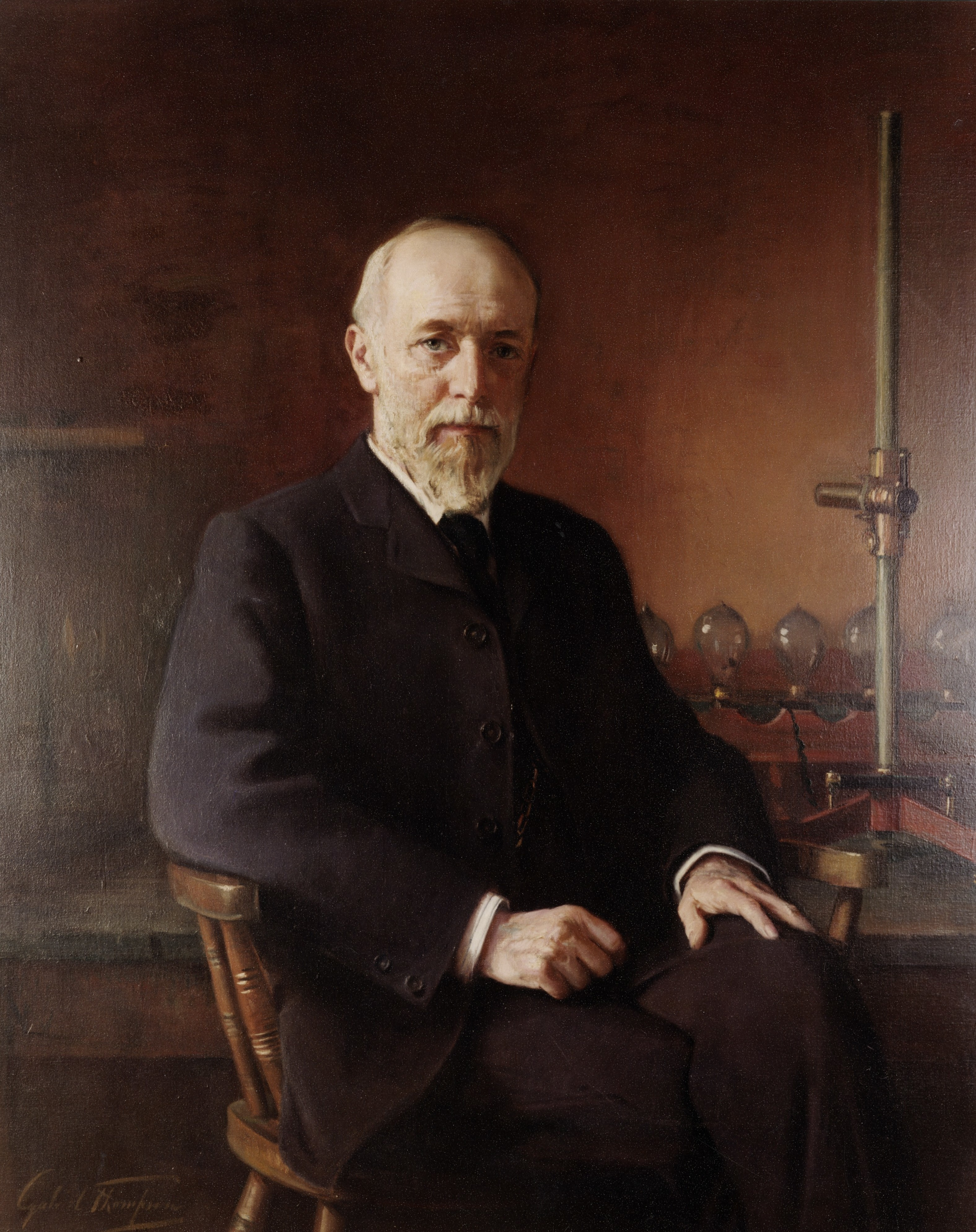
- Portrait by Gabriel Thompson
- Born: 15 June 1851; Brecon
- Died: 3 March 1932 (aged 80); Cambridge
- Education: Owens College; Sidney Sussex College, Cambridge
- Board member of: British Association for the Advancement of Science
- Spouse(s): Elizabeth Martha, née Clark (m. 1877; died 1918)
- Awards: Hughes Medal (1907)
- Scientific career
- Fields: Physics
- Workplaces: Sidney Sussex College, Cambridge; Jesus College, Oxford
- Notable students: C. T. R. Wilson; Ezer Griffiths

Principal of University College of South Wales and Monmouthshire
- In office 1901–1919
- Preceded by: John Viriamu Jones
- Succeeded by: A. H. Trow

Vice-chancellor of University of Wales
- In office 1915–1917
- Preceded by: Thomas Francis Roberts
- Succeeded by: Henry Reichel
- In office 1909–1911
- Preceded by: Thomas Francis Roberts
- Succeeded by: Henry Reichel
- In office 1903–1905
- Preceded by: Thomas Francis Roberts
- Succeeded by: Henry Reichel

Ernest Howard Griffiths (15 June 1851 – 3 March 1932) was a British physicist born in Brecon, Wales. He was elected a Fellow of the Royal Society in 1895 and won its Hughes Medal in 1907.

== Early life and family ==
Griffiths was born on 15 June 1851 in Brecknock to Mary (née Blake) and the Reverend Henry Griffiths. His father was the principal of Brecon Congregational Memorial College. On his maternal side, he was a descendant of the 17th-century admiral Robert Blake.

Griffiths was educated at Owens College, Manchester, where he was awarded the Whitworth Scholarship. He went on to matriculate at Sidney Sussex College, Cambridge in Michaelmas term in 1870, taking the Advanced Science Special Examination. He graduated with his BA in 1874 and was awarded his MA in 1877.

== Academic career ==
After his undergraduate studies, Griffiths remained in Cambridge and worked as a private tutor and examination coach. He was seen as a trusted tutor due to the exam results achieved by his students. He later became a lecturer at Sidney Sussex College and in 1890 was approved as a teacher of Physics to medical students.

Griffiths also continued his research in experimental physics at his home laboratory. He was frequently visited by fellow physicist Lord Kelvin whenever the latter travelled to Cambridge. Much of his work was published in Transactions of the Royal Society and by 1895, he was elected a Fellow of the Royal Society on account of his publications. He later submitted his 1985 paper, The latent heat of evaporation of water, to the University of Wales as a DSc thesis. He was awarded the doctorate in 1902.

Griffiths was appointed principal of the University College of South Wales and Monmouthshire, Cardiff in 1901 and given a professorship in experimental philosophy. He was the institution' second ever principals, having succeeded the inaugural principal John Viriamu Jones. He was a Fellow of Jesus College, Oxford in 1905, 1909, 1913, and 1917, as part of a system whereby a college fellowship rotated amongst the principals of Welsh university colleges. Griffiths's tenure at Cardiff saw the construction of new college buildings in Cathays Park, notably the Viriamu Jones Memorial Laboratory, which was completed in 1909.

Griffiths joined the Cardiff Naturalists' Society as he started his principal post and in 1905 was elected as the society's 33rd President. He was also an active member of the British Association for the Advancement of Science, serving as president of Section A (Mathematics and Physics) in 1906 and Section L (Education) in 1913, as well as general treasurer of the association for some years.

During World War I, Griffiths served on the British government's Chemical Warfare Committee.

Griffiths retired from his principal position at Cardiff in 1918 and was conferred the title of emeritus professor of experimental philosophy upon his retirement.

=== Notable students ===
Griffiths's entry in Alumni Cantabrigienses describes him as "well known to undergraduates". Among his students at Cambridge was C. T. R. Wilson, who went on win the Nobel Prize in Physics in 1927, becoming the only Scottish person to achieve this accolade.

Physicist Ezer Griffiths, unrelated to him despite sharing his surname, worked in Griffiths's lab at Cardiff and was influenced by the latter's works. They jointly published papers on the heat capacity of specific metals.

== Honours and recognition ==
In 1897, Griffiths was appointed as a fellow of Sidney Sussex College, which later made him an honorary fellow in 1904. In 1907, he was awarded the Hughes Medal by the Royal Society for his work in measuring fundamental constants in thermal and electric energy. Report of this achievement in the journal Nature commended that "at a time when the equivalent of the thermal unit in mechanical energy stood urgently in need of revision, he devoted himself to the problem with all the refinements and patient manipulation that could be devised".

He was awarded an honorary LLD by University of Aberdeen, as well as honorary DSc degrees from Victoria University of Manchester (in 1902) and University of Liverpool (in 1923).

== Personal life and death ==
Griffiths was married to Elizabeth Martha (née Clark) from 1877 until her death in 1918, shortly after his retirement. They had no children.

Griffiths suffered from acute arthritis towards the end of his life, which prevented him from writing and scientific pursuits. He died at his home in Cambridge on 3 March 1932.
