= Eleanor Vachell =

British botanist

Eleanor Vachell FLS
- Eleanor Vachell circa 1930
- Born: 8 January 1879
- Died: 6 December 1948 (aged 69)
- Scientific career
- Fields: Botany
- Institutions: Cardiff Naturalists' Society; National Museum of Wales
- Author abbrev. (botany): Vachell

64th President of Cardiff Naturalists' Society
- In office 1936–1937
- Preceded by: Harold Augustus Hyde
- Succeeded by: Frederick Rees

Eleanor Vachell (1879–1948) was a British botanist who is remembered especially for her work identifying and studying the flora of Glamorgan and her connection with the National Museum of Wales where she was the first woman to be a member of its Council and Court of Governors. The museum now holds her botanical diary, notes, books, records and specimens.

== Early life ==
She was the eldest child of Winifred and Charles Tanfield Vachell, a physician in Cardiff where she was born on 8 January 1879, followed in the 1890s by her brother Eustace and sister Sylvia. She went to school in Cardiff, Malvern, and Brighton. Her father was a keen amateur botanist, and from childhood she went with him on botanical trips across the UK and Ireland as well as in Brittany, Norway and Switzerland. She started keeping a botanical diary when she was twelve and used it throughout her life to record expeditions and finds. Her ambition was to see in situ every plant recognised as a British species and she ticked off her finds by colouring illustrations in a reference book. This eventually led to her building up an almost unrivalled knowledge of UK and Irish plants in their native habitats. It is believed she saw all but thirteen species during her life.

== Botanical interests ==
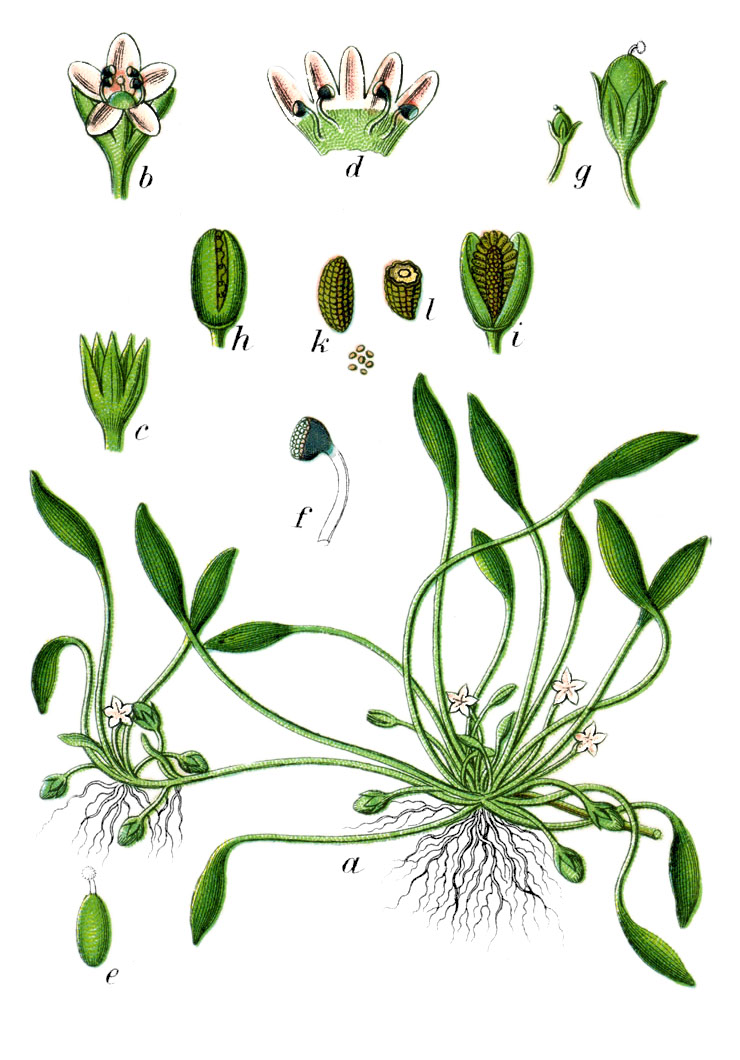
Limosella aquatica, closely related to Vachell's discovery, Limosella aquatica x subulata

From 1903 Vachell was the honorary secretary of a committee preparing the first volume of the Flora of Glamorgan. The editor A. H. Trow, was Professor of Botany at University College, Cardiff from 1905 to 1919, and he offered encouragement to her in her botanical work. (Note: Albert Howard Trow (1863–1939). See Commons category:Albert Howard Trow for further information) As well as contributing to that volume and acting as Recorder for continuing plant-finding in Glamorgan, she contributed extensively to the Transactions of the Cardiff Naturalists' Society where she was the first woman elected to membership of their Biological and Geological Section and, in 1936-7, was the society's first woman president. She was elected a Fellow of the Linnaean Society in 1917.

She belonged to the Wild Flower Society and the Botanical Exchange Club and went on plant-hunting trips with friends who were also members, including Gertrude Foggitt and Joanna Charlotte Davy. Like them, she had a private income. Her companions and their travels together are described in Vachell's diary. In 1926 she was asked by the British Museum to investigate a report of the Ghost Orchid. This is one of Britain's rarest plants and for many years the Amgueddfa Cymru (National Museum of Wales) had only a small rhizome that had been gathered by Vachell on 29 May 1926. In the 1930s she discovered the hybrid Limosella aquatica x subulata with Dr Kathleen B. Blackburn.

Every week from 1921 to 1948 she contributed a column on wild flowers to the Western Mail and in the 1920s she broadcast talks on wild flowers on BBC radio.

== Other activities ==
During both world wars she suspended her botanical interests to do voluntary work. She was said to be a "keen churchwoman" and was active in the Red Cross where she became a Commandant and then a Vice-President. In World War I she was a VAD at a military hospital, the 3rd Western General Hospital in Cardiff. In the Second World War she acted as deputy chairman of the Women's Land Army for Glamorgan and was its visiting representative. She also took charge of the library at the Rookwood Hospital, Llandaff.

== Legacy ==
She died on 6 December 1948. One of her obituarists, H. A. Hyde, keeper of botany at the National Museum of Wales, said she gave much help and encouragement to younger botanists and shared her expertise generously. She left a herbarium she had assembled along with her father to the National Museum of Wales, to be called the C. T. & E. Vachell herbarium. She also left her diary, books, records, notes and £500 for the upkeep of her bequest. Her will specified an additional £500 "to form a fund to assist amateur botanical research" and the expenses of publishing a future "Flora of Glamorgan" making use of her manuscripts. In 2012 she was one of thirteen women featured in an exhibition called "Inspirational Botanists – Women of Wales" at the National Botanic Garden of Wales.

The standard author abbreviation Vachell is used to indicate her as the author when citing a botanical name.

== Bibliography ==
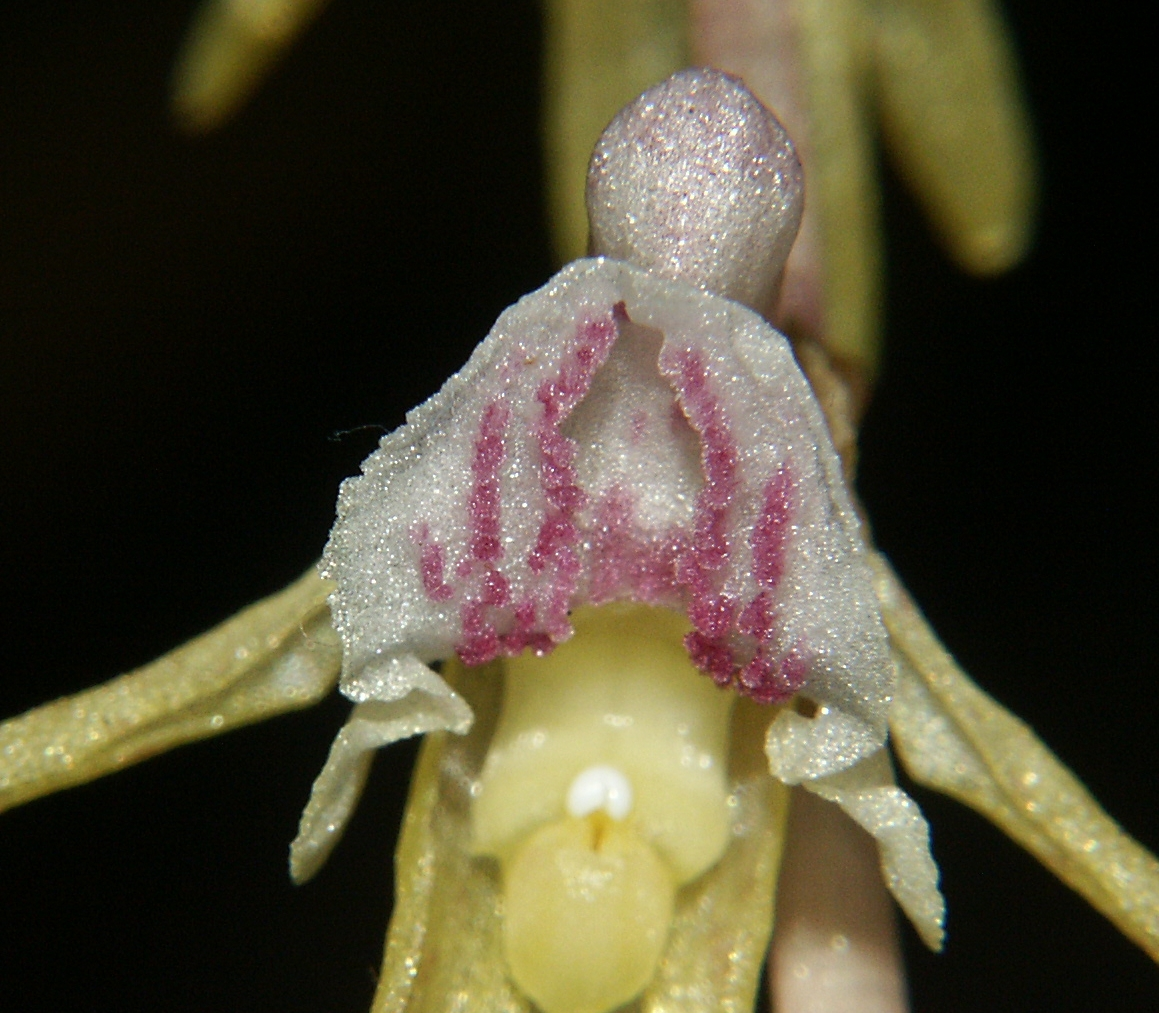
European ghost orchid or Epipogium aphyllum

- The leek: the national emblem of Wales, William Lewis 1922
- 'Meeting of some of the Botanical Society of the British Isles in Glamorgan, 1927, with Botanical excursion in Somerset', with W.D. Miller, Report of the Botanical Exchange Club, 1927, pp. 456–459
- 'A list of Glamorgan plants', Report of the Botanical Exchange Club, 1933, pp. 686–743
- 'Glamorgan flowering plants and ferns', in Glamorgan County History, vol 1 – Natural History, William Lewis 1936, pp123–178
- 'Botanical notes and Limosella plants of Glamorgan', Transactions of the Cardiff Naturalists' Society, vol. 71, 1938, pp. 29–35
- 'The Limosella plants of Glamorgan', Journal of Botany, 1939, pp65-71
- Michelle Forty, Tim Rich eds., The botanical diary of Eleanor Vachell (1879–1948), National Museum of Wales, 2005
