= John Viriamu Jones =

Welsh mathematician and physicist

John Viriamu FRS
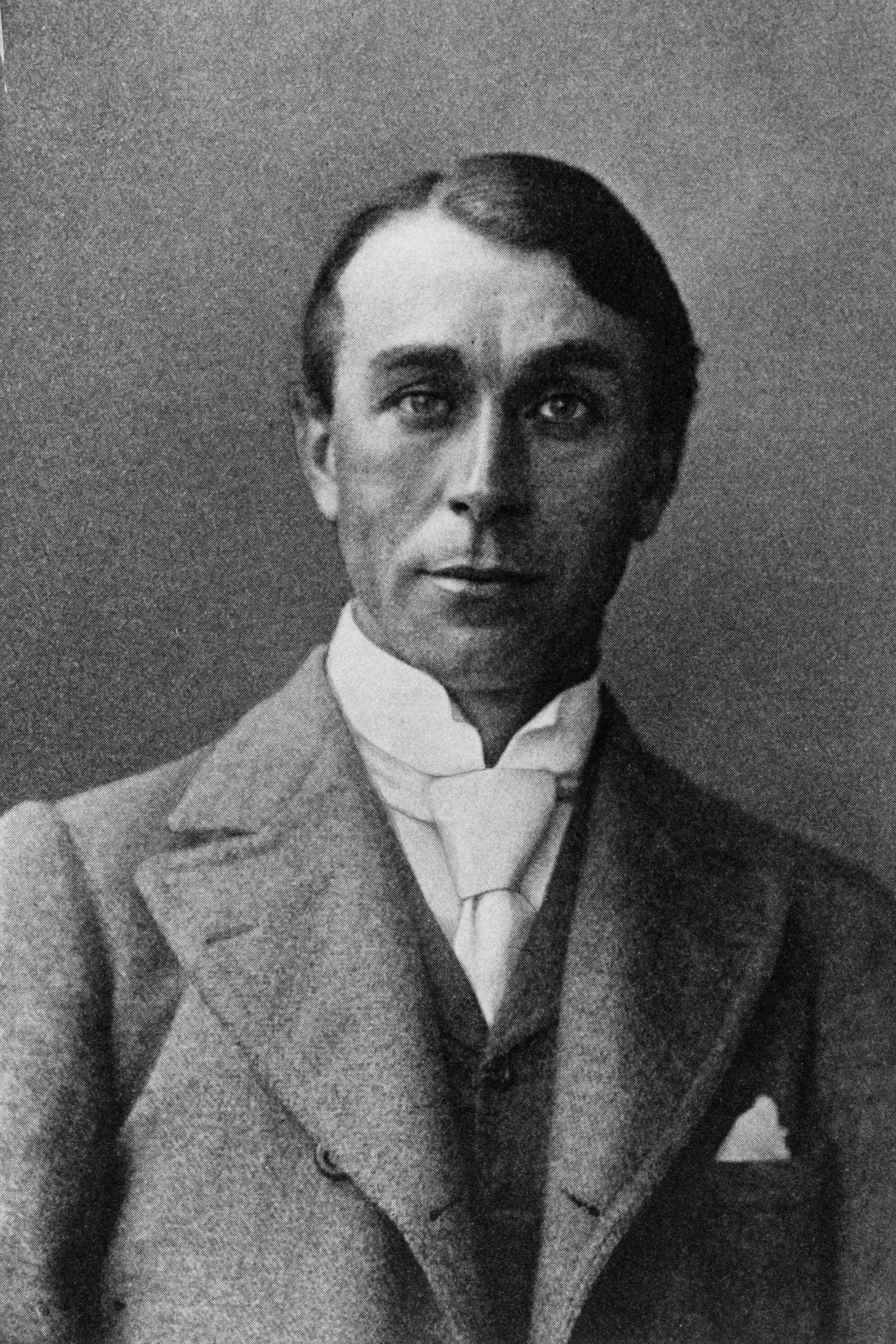
- Jones in 1890
- Born: 2 January 1856; Swansea
- Died: 1 June 1901 (aged 45); Geneva
- Education: University College School, London; Normal College, Swansea
- Alma mater: University College London (geology); Balliol College, Oxford (mathematics and natural sciences)
- Known for: Lorenz apparatus of the ohm
- Spouse: Sarah Katherine Wills (m. 1882)
- Parents: Thomas Jones (father); Jane Jones (mother)
- Relatives: David Brynmor Jones (older brother); Leifchild Jones, 1st Baron Rhayader (younger brother)
- Scientific career
- Fields: Physics

Principal of University College of South Wales and Monmouthshire
- In office 1883–1901
- Preceded by: 1st incumbent
- Succeeded by: Ernest Howard Griffiths

Vice-chancellor of University of Wales
- In office 1895–1896
- Preceded by: 1st incumbent
- Succeeded by: Henry Reichel
- In office 1898–1900
- Preceded by: Thomas Francis Roberts
- Succeeded by: Henry Reichel

Principal of Firth College, Sheffield
- In office 1881–1883

John Viriamu Jones, FRS (2 January 1856 – 1 June 1901), was a Welsh scientist, who worked on measuring the ohm, and an educationalist who was instrumental in establishing the University of Sheffield and Cardiff University.

== Early life and studies ==
John Viriamu Jones was born on 2 January 1856 in Pentrepoeth in Swansea, the third of the six children of Thomas Jones, a celebrated Independent clergyman, and Jane Jones. He was named after the missionary and martyr John Williams – 'Viriamu' being the Erromanga for "Williams". His older siblings were David Brynmor (b. 1851) and Annie; his younger brothers were Irvonwy, Leifchild Stratten (b. 1862) and Morlais Glasfryn. His older brother, David Brynmor Jones, and younger brother, Leifchild Jones, 1st Baron Rhayader, both achieved prominence in public life.

In 1858, Jones's parents moved to London, and he was educated firstly at a private school in Reading, then at University College School in London. In 1867 his mother died, and at the end of 1869 his father left London and returned to Swansea, where he stayed until 1877; and John Viriamu continued his education at the Normal College, Swansea, before entering University College London at the age of 16. He obtained his first degree there at age 19 and in 1874 won a scholarship to the University of Oxford (Balliol college), where he became a friend of Benjamin Jowett and obtained first class honours in both mathematics and physics.

== Career ==
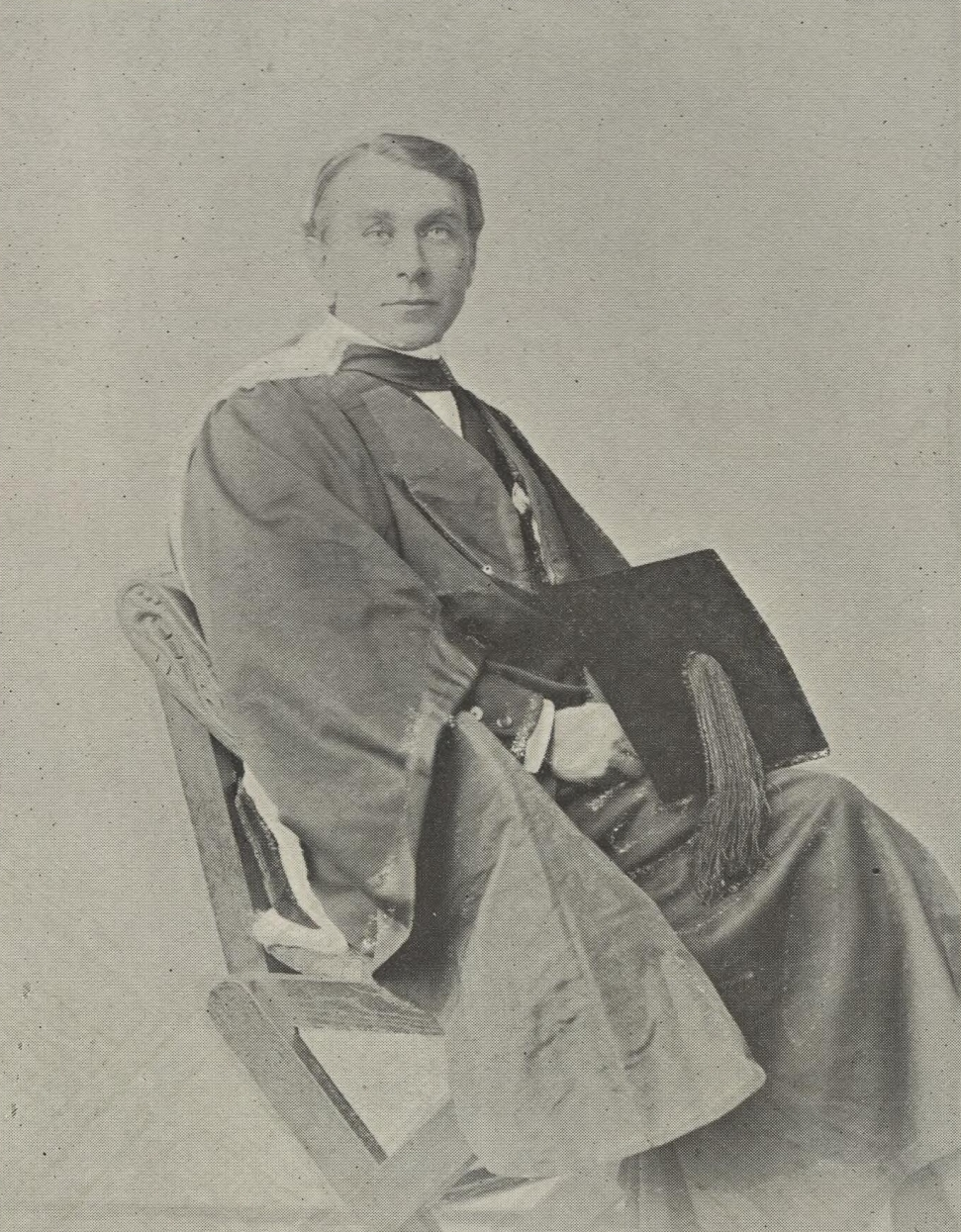
John Viriamu Jones, c. 1900

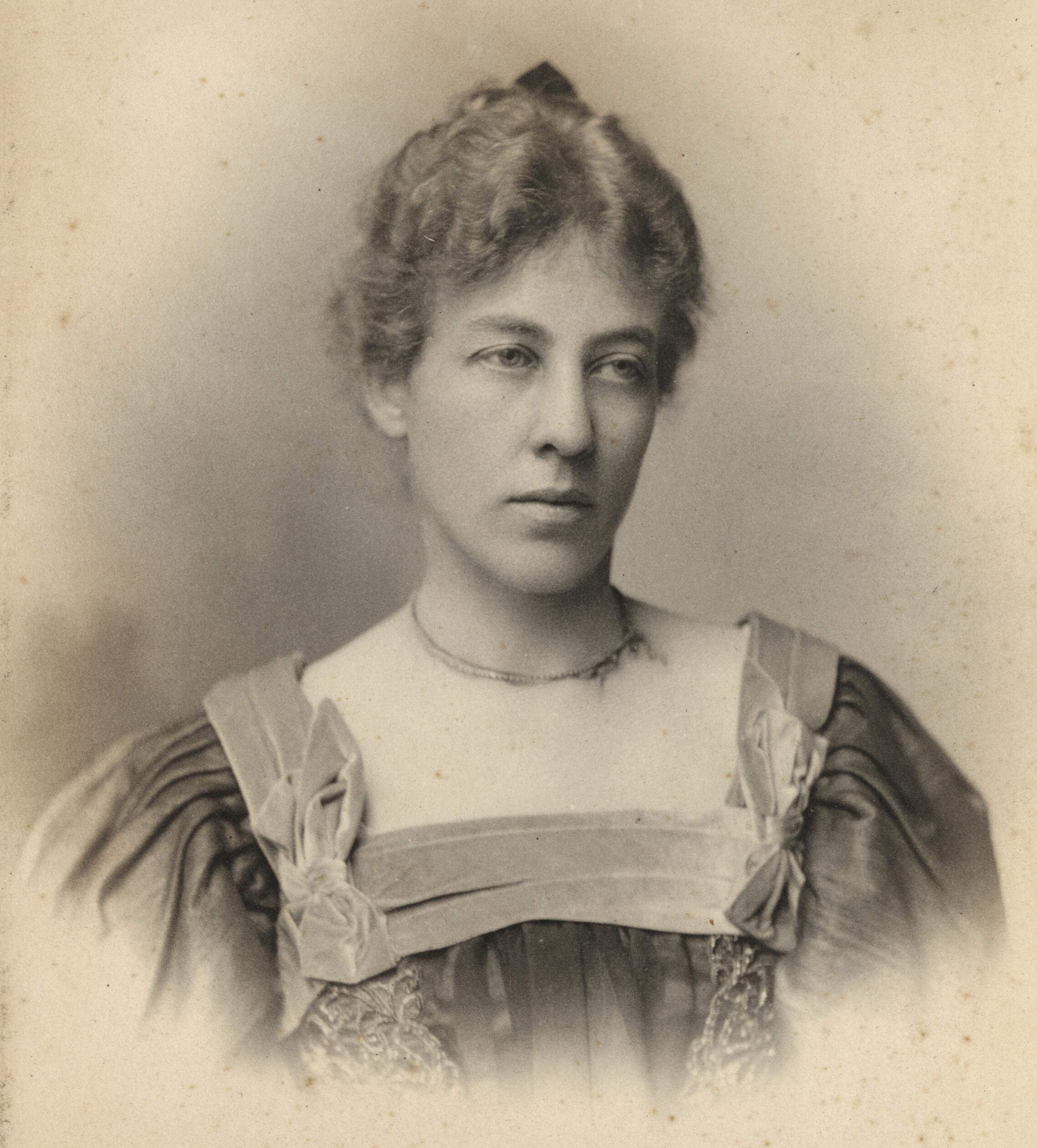
Jones' wife Katharine, author of his biography Life of John Viriamu Jones

In 1881, at the early age of twenty-five, Jones became principal of Firth College in Sheffield – later the University of Sheffield. In 1882 he married Sarah Katherine Wills, daughter of William Ridout Wills, the brother of judge Sir Alfred Wills.

In 1883, still in his twenties, Jones became the first principal of the University College of South Wales and Monmouthshire (afterwards Cardiff University) and the head of its Physics Department. At the same time he became principal of the Cardiff Technical School (forerunner of the University of Wales Institute of Science and Technology (UWIST)).

In 1895, he was appointed the first vice-chancellor of the University of Wales; and he also worked to raise the standard of secondary education in Wales. He became an ex officio Fellow of Jesus College, Oxford 1897–98. Amid all these activities he found time to pursue scientific research, and in 1894 he was elected a Fellow of the Royal Society for his work on measuring the ohm.

Jones died suddenly in Geneva in June 1901, at the age of forty-five. His body was returned to Swansea, to be buried near his father at St Thomas's cemetery.
