= Frederick Rees =

Welsh academic (1883–1967)

Sir Frederick Rees
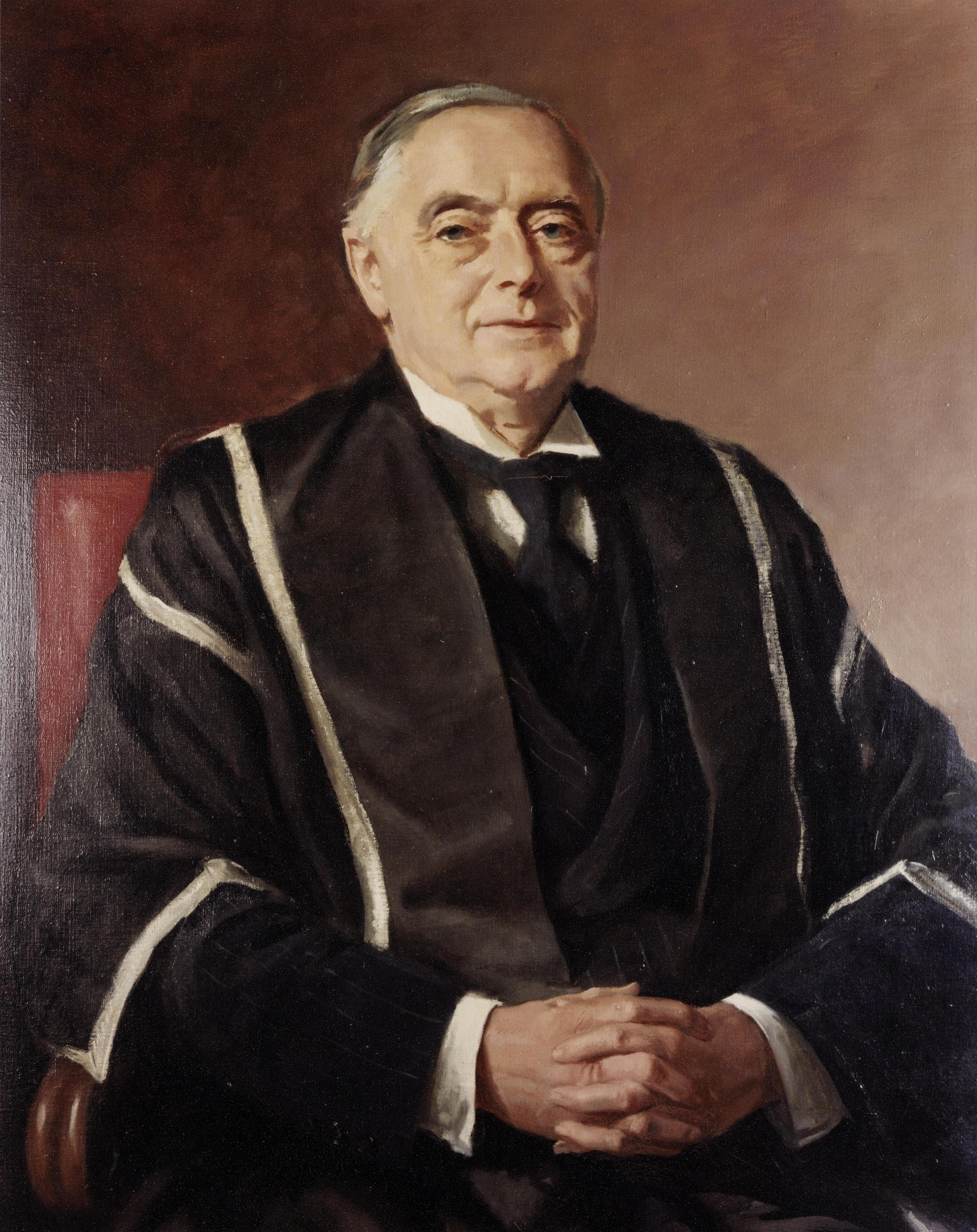
- Portrait of Rees by Oswald Birley, c.1930-40s
- Born: 13 December 1883; Milford Haven
- Died: 7 January 1967 (aged 83); Cardiff
- Spouse(s): Dora Rose Lucile Rees, née Davies (m. 1913)
- Children: 1 son

Academic background
- Education: University College, Cardiff; Lincoln College, Oxford

Academic work
- Discipline: History, Economics
- Sub-discipline: Economic history, History of Wales
- Institutions: University College, Bangor; Queen's University Belfast; University of Edinburgh; University of Birmingham; University of Ceylon

High Sheriff of Pembrokeshire
- In office 1955
- Preceded by: Patrick Herbert Lort Phillips
- Succeeded by: Norman Stuart Perkins

Principal of University College of South Wales and Monmouthshire
- In office 1929–1949
- Preceded by: Albert Howard Trow
- Succeeded by: C. W. L. Bevan

Vice-chancellor of University of Wales
- First term 1935–1937
- Preceded by: Emrys Evans
- Succeeded by: Ifor Leslie Evans
- Second term 1944–1946
- Preceded by: Emrys Evans
- Succeeded by: Ifor Leslie Evans

65th President of Cardiff Naturalists' Society
- In office 1937–1938
- Preceded by: Eleanor Vachell
- Succeeded by: Frank Bird

Sir James Frederick Rees (13 December 1883 – 7 January 1967), known as Frederick Rees, was a Welsh historian and academic born in Milford Haven in South West Wales, who specialised in economic history and the history of Wales.

== Early life and education ==
Rees was born in Milford Haven in 1883. His father, John Rees, was a dock worker. Rees was educated locally. He enrolled in University College, Cardiff in 1901 and earned a First Class degree in History in 1904. He later attended Lincoln College, Oxford and earned another First Class degree in Modern History in 1908.

== Academic career ==
Having earned his degree at Oxford, Rees worked as an assistant lecturer at University College, Bangor from 1908 to 1912, followed by a brief period as a lecturer at Queen's University Belfast. Rees then joined the University of Edinburgh as Reader in Economic History in 1913. While there, he had two books published, Rees (1920) and Rees (1921). In 1925, Rees was appointed professor of Commerce at the University of Birmingham.

From 1929 to 1949, Rees was Principal of University College of South Wales and Monmouthshire. While there he had two books published, Rees (1933) and (1954). He was additionally Vice-Chancellor of the University of Wales from 1935 to 1937 and again from 1944 to 1946.

Rees was a visiting professor in Economics at University of Ceylon from 1953 to 1955. In 1956, he returned to Edinburgh University as the head of its Economic History department, a role that he held for two years. He had a collection of essays published in 1963 and book published about studies in Welsh history in 1965.

== Outside academia ==
Rees was President of the Cardiff Naturalists Society from 1937 to 1938. He was also a member of many governmental committees. Some notable appointments were:

- Consultative Committee on the Welsh Problems of Reconstruction (chair, 1942–46),
- Soulbury commission on Reforming the Constitution of Sri Lanka (1944–45),
- Local Government Boundary Commission (1945–1949).

Rees served as High Sheriff of Pembrokeshire, his home county, for 1955.

== Honours ==
In the 1945 New Year Honours, Rees was appointed a Knight Bachelor, and thereby granted the title sir, in recognition of his service as Principal of the University College of South Wales and Monmouthshire, Cardiff and as Vice-Chancellor of the University of Wales. He was knighted by King George VI during a ceremony at Buckingham Palace.

Rees also received honorary LLD from Universities of Wales, Birmingham and Edinburgh.

== Personal life and death ==
Rees married his wife, Dora Rose Lucile (née Davies), in 1913 and they had one son. Rees died in 1967 at his home in Cardiff.

== Selected works ==
- Rees, J.F. (1920). A Social & Industrial History of England, 1815-1918. London: Methuen & Company Limited.
- —— (1921). A Short Fiscal and Financial History of England, 1815-1918. London: Methuen & Company Limited.
- —— (1933). A Survey of Economic Development: With Special Reference to Great Britain. London: Sir I. Pitman & Sons, Limited.
- —— (1954). The Story of Milford: (Milford Haven). Cardiff: University of Wales Press.
- —— (1963). The Problem of Wales: And Other Essays. Cardiff: University of Wales Press. ISBN 978-0708300695.
- —— (1965). Studies in Welsh History Collected papers, lectures and reviews (Second ed.). Cardiff: University of Wales Press.

Academic offices
Preceded by Emrys Evans	Vice-Chancellor of the University of Wales; 1935 to 1937	Succeeded by Ifor Leslie Evans
Preceded by Emrys Evans	Vice-Chancellor of the University of Wales; 1944 to 1946	Succeeded by Ifor Leslie Evans
