= Maria Dawson =

British botanist (b. 1875)

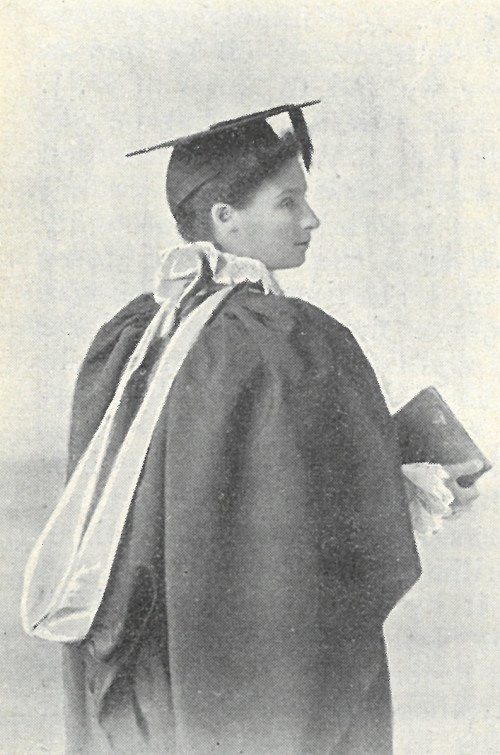
- Maria Dawson at her graduation in 1896
- Education: University of South Wales
- Awards: 1851 Science Research Scholarship
- Scientific career
- Fields: Botany
- Workplaces: Cambridge Botanic Gardens; University College, Aberystwyth
- Academic advisors: Harry Marshall Ward
- Notable students: Frederick Wallace Edwards

Maria Dawson (born 6 March 1875) was a British botanist who was the first person to receive a degree from the University of Wales. She then joined a group of women carrying out scientific research with Harry Marshall Ward at the University of Cambridge in the 1890s, and received a doctorate in 1901. She focused on questions of industrial fertilisation, and also had an influential career as a science teacher.

== Life and career ==
Born in London on 6 March 1875, she was educated at the John Roan School in Greenwich.

Dawson began studying mathematics, chemistry, zoology and botany at Aberdare Hall, the women's accommodation of the University College of South Wales and Monmouthshire (which would become Cardiff University) in October 1892. She received her BSc in June 1896 as the first and only graduate that year. Previously, students had received their degrees externally from the University of London, but while Dawson was studying, it joined with University College Wales and University College North Wales to form the University of Wales.

Dawson also passed the BSc examination of the University of London in October of the same year. After her graduation, she worked as a temporary demonstrator at the University of Wales in return for advanced instruction in botany from the lecturer A.H. Trow.

In 1897, Dawson received an 1851 Science Research Scholarship for industrial research, which allowed her to work with Harry Marshal Ward, a Cambridge botanist known for his support of women scientists, at the Cambridge University Botanic Gardens. She was one of seven women in Ward's first unofficial research group, along with Anna Bateson, Edith Saunders, Dorothea Pertz, Jane Gowan, and Ethel Sargant. With Marshall Ward, Dawson studied the fungus Poronia punctate, but their main focus was nitrogen-fixing fertilisation. She tested the industrial fertiliser 'Nitragin' and found that its effectiveness was dependent on the soil's existing nutrient levels and bacterial flora. While at Cambridge, Dawson also analysed the composition of a thousand-year-old Hebrew manuscript discovered at Old Cairo.

Dawson lectured in botany at University College, Aberystwyth from 1901, and received a DSc from the University of London that year.

She then taught natural history at the Cambridge and County School for Boys. Entomologist Frederick Wallace Edwards was among the pupils she inspired with a love of science.

Dawson then returned to industry, and worked with fruit trees at a jam manufacturer.

== Select publications ==
- Dawson, Maria, '"Nitragin" and the nodules of leguminous plants,' Philosophical Transactions of the Royal Society B 192 (1899), 1-28.
- Dawson, Maria, 'On the biology of Poronia punctata (L),' Annals of Botany 14 (1900), 245-267.
- Dawson, Maria, 'On the economic importance of "Nitragin",' Annals of Botany 15 (1901), 511-519.
