= Ezer Griffiths =

Welsh physicist (1888–1962)

- Born: 27 November 1888
- Died: 14 February 1962 (aged 73)
- Education: University College of South Wales and Monmouthshire
- Awards: OBE; FRS
- Scientific career
- Workplaces: National Physical Laboratory

Ezer Griffiths (27 November 1888 – 14 February 1962) was a Welsh physicist most noted for his work on the insulation properties of metals, heat transference, evaporation and refrigeration.

== Education and early life ==
Griffiths was born in Aberdare in 1888 to a colliery mechanic, and from 1901 to 1906 he was educated at Aberdare Intermediate School. He graduated to University College of South Wales and Monmouthshire and studied under Ernest Howard Griffiths.

== Career ==
On leaving Cardiff, he gained a post in the National Physical Laboratory in Teddington.

Griffiths spent his entire career studying the physical theory of heat. His initial works focused on the effects of heat on metal at low temperatures, in conjuncture with his tutor, Ernest Griffiths. His later work on refrigeration would enable the transportation of fruit and meats from Australia and New Zealand to Europe.
