= William Adams (mining engineer) =

Welsh mining engineer and naturalist (1813 - 1886)

William Adams (1813 - 1886) of Ebbw Vale began his career as an apprentice to Charles Lloyd Harford. In 1865 he moved to Cardiff, and commenced business as colliery agent and mining engineer. He was regarded as an expert in his field, his publications include 'Science of Mining' (London, 1870). He is known to have been one of the first members of Cardiff Naturalists' Society.
