= Charles Reichel =

Charles Parsons Reichel was an Anglican bishop and author in the 19th century.
He was born in 1816, educated at Trinity College, Dublin and ordained in 1847. After a curacy at St. Mary's Church, Dublin he was a Professor of Latin at Queen's College, Belfast from 1850 to 1864. During his career he held incumbencies at Trim, Mullingar, and Clonmacnoise. He was Archdeacon of Meath from 1875 to 1882;Dean of Clonmacnoise from 1882 to 1885 before being consecrated Bishop of Meath in 1885, a position he held until his death on 29 March 1894.

His son Sir Henry Reichel was the first Principal of the University College of North Wales and a Vice-Chancellor of the University of Wales.

== Arms ==
Coat of arms of Charles Reichel
| Notes Confirmed on 24 November 1885 by Sir John Bernard Burke, Ulster King of Arms. Crest Out of a ducal coronet a demi-lion rampant double queued holding between the paws a sickle all Or. Escutcheon Per fess Sable and Or a lion rampant double queued holding between the paws a sickle all counterchanged. Motto Vitam Impendere Vero |
