= Henry Stuart Jones =

British lexicographer, academic (1867–1939)

Sir Henry Stuart Jones FBA (15 May 1867 – 29 June 1939) was a British academic. He was educated at Balliol College, Oxford; he obtained a First in Classical Moderations in 1888 and a First in Literae Humaniores ('Greats', a combination of philosophy and ancient history) in 1890. He was appointed to a Fellowship at Trinity College, Oxford, in 1897.

From 1903 to 1905 he was Director of the British School at Rome and, in 1920, moved from Trinity to Brasenose College to take up the post of Camden Professor of Ancient History which he held until 1927 when he took up a series of Welsh academic posts listed below. Originally, Stuart was his second forename, but he and his wife generally prefixed it to their surname, and he was knighted in 1933 under the name Stuart-Jones.

== Career ==
He attended the British School at Athens and later served as director of the British School at Rome.

For Oxford University Press, Stuart Jones edited Thucydides' Historiae, the history of the Peloponnesian War, in two volumes. The first volume was published in 1900, the second in the next year. This work is still in print more than a century later, in the edition revised by Enoch Powell.

Stuart Jones began in 1911 the revision of A Greek-English Lexicon, the standard dictionary of ancient Greek, with the assistance of Roderick McKenzie. A preliminary edition was published under the supervision of Stuart Jones and McKenzie in 1925, but the completed revision was published by Oxford University Press in 1940 only after both men's deaths. In a preface to the revision, the Press described Stuart Jones in these terms:

Sir Henry was the ideal Editor; his wide range of knowledge and his exact scholarship, his persistent devotion to his task even in periods of ill health, his tactful assiduity in consulting experts and his skill in co-ordinating their results, gave the work at once its consistency and its elasticity.

Stuart Jones began his relationship with Wales when, in 1927, he became a candidate for the principalship of the University College of Wales, Aberystwyth. His tenure in Wales would prove to be an enthusiastic one: during his time there, he learned the Welsh language and served on the committees of a number of Welsh institutions, including the council of St David's College, Lampeter, as well as Trinity College, Carmarthen, and the National Library of Wales. He also served as vice-chancellor of the federal University of Wales in 1929 and 1930. He was also elected (in 1928) to a Welsh Supernumerary Fellowship of Jesus College, Oxford in his capacity as Principal of the University College of Wales, Aberystwyth.

He was on the governing body of Abingdon School from 1920 to 1922.

== Death ==
He died on 29 June 1939, aged 72.

Academic offices
Preceded by John Humphreys Davies	Principal of the University College of Wales Aberystwyth; 1927-1934	Succeeded by Ifor Leslie Evans
