= William John Evans =

Welsh musician

William John Evans (29 November 1866 – 12 December 1947) was a Welsh musician and composer, best known for his hymn-tunes.

Evans was born in Aberdare, and began his career as an apprentice to his father, a tailor who was also a musician. He became organise of Siloa Chapel, in his home town, and his musical works were mainly composed within the context of the eisteddfod, both locally and nationally. He conducted orchestras and choirs at music festivals throughout Wales. The best known of his hymn-tunes is "Rhys", which was written in memory of his father.

In 1895 he married Mary Elizabeth Milligan. Their son, with whom he lived after his wife's death, was the academic Ifor Leslie Evans.

When, in 1906, Evans returned to Aberdare after successfully conducting the Cynon Male Voice Choir at the National Eisteddfod of Wales in Caernarfon, he was given a hero's welcome at the local station and a reception by the local council. He later became conductor of the Aberaman Institute Choir.

Evans died in Aberystwyth, aged 81.
