= University of Wales =

University in Cardiff, Wales

- Prifysgol Cymru (Welsh)
- Coat of arms
- Latin: Universitas Cambrensis
- Motto: Welsh: Goreu Awen Gwirionedd
- Motto in English: The Best Inspiration is Truth
- Type: Confederal, non-membership university
- Established: 1893; 133 years ago
- Affiliations: Association of Commonwealth Universities
- Chancellor: King Charles III
- Vice-Chancellor: Elwen Evans
- Location: Cardiff, Wales
Colours
- Website: wales.ac.uk

The University of Wales (Welsh: Prifysgol Cymru) is a confederal university based in Cardiff, Wales. Founded by royal charter in 1893 as a federal university with three constituent colleges – Aberystwyth, Bangor and Cardiff – the university was the first university established in Wales, one of the four countries within the United Kingdom. The university was, prior to the break up of the federation, the second largest university in the UK.

A federal university similar to the University of London, the University of Wales was in charge of examining students, while its colleges were in charge of teaching. The University of Wales was the only university in Wales prior to the establishment of the University of Glamorgan in 1992.

Former colleges under the University of Wales included most of the now independent universities in Wales: Aberystwyth University (formerly University of Wales, Aberystwyth), Bangor University (formerly University of Wales, Bangor), St David's University College (later University of Wales, Lampeter, and now merged with University of Wales Trinity Saint David), Cardiff University (formerly University of Wales, Cardiff), Swansea University (formerly University of Wales, Swansea), Cardiff Metropolitan University (formerly University of Wales Institute, Cardiff) and University of Wales, Newport (which merged with Glamorgan University in April 2013 to form the University of South Wales).

In 2007, the University of Wales changed from a federal structure to a confederal one, and many of the constituent colleges became independent universities. Following a number of controversies in the late 2000s involving overseas affiliates, cheating and student visas, a decision was made to abolish the university as it then existed.

From August 2017 it has been functionally integrated with the University of Wales Trinity Saint David. The Higher Education Statistics Agency recorded zero students registered with the University of Wales in the UK in 2018/19, but 3,345 students registered on transnational education courses outside the UK.

It also collaborated with the University of Malaya in 2013 to establish the International University of Malaya-Wales (IUMW), a private university in Malaysia.

== History ==
=== Origins ===
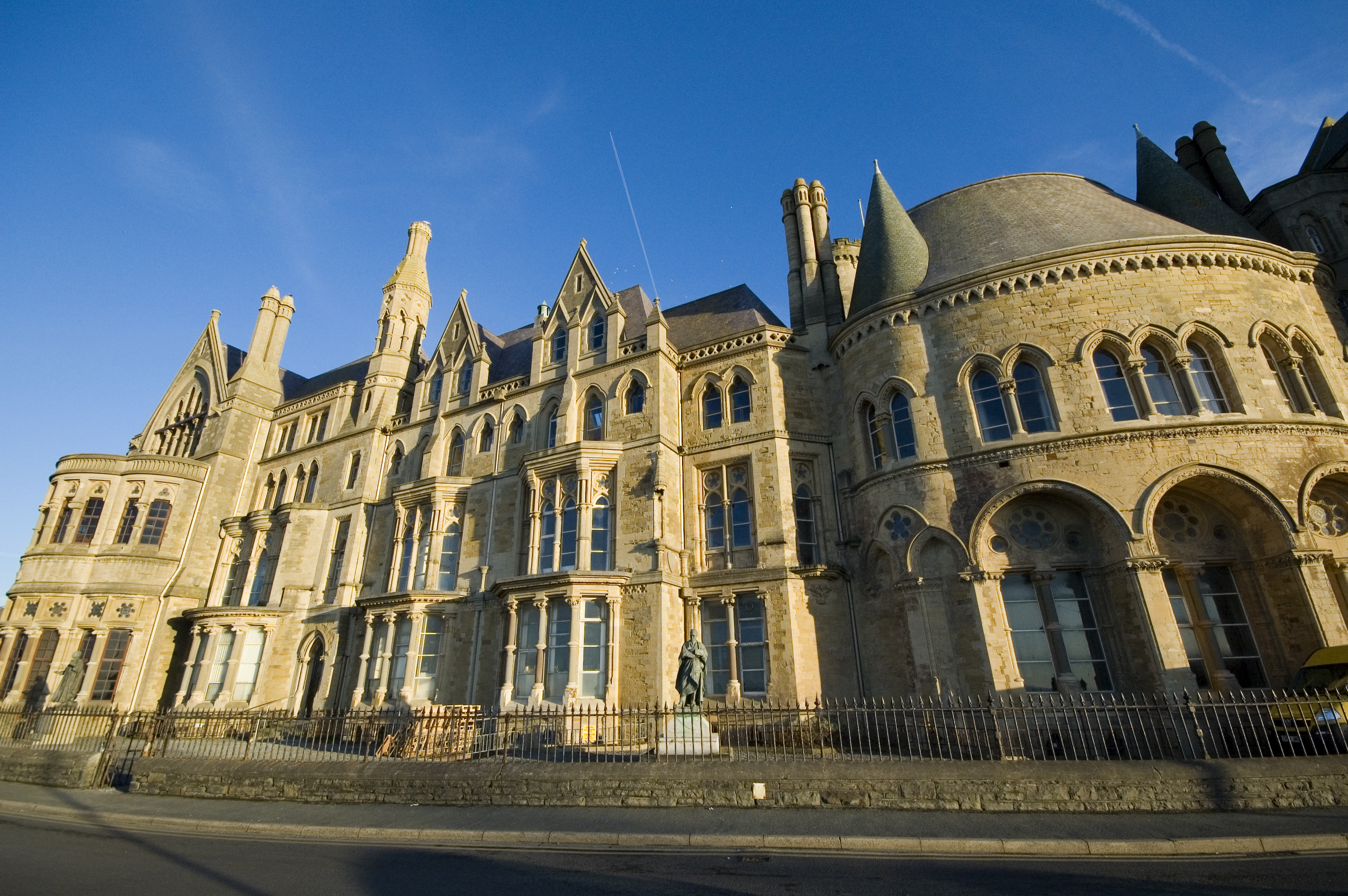
University College Wales (now Aberystwyth University) was the oldest founding member of the University of Wales

The University of Wales was founded in Wales in 1893 as a federal university with three foundation colleges: University College Wales (now Aberystwyth University), which had been founded in 1872; University College North Wales (now Bangor University); University College South Wales and Monmouthshire (now Cardiff University). The last two had been founded following the Aberdare Report in 1881. Prior to the foundation of the federal university, these three colleges had prepared students for the examinations of the University of London. The University of Wales held its first graduation ceremony in 1897, awarding a BSc to Maria Dawson.

A fourth college, Swansea (now Swansea University), was added in 1920 and in 1931 the Welsh National School of Medicine was incorporated. In 1967, the Welsh College of Advanced Technology entered the federal university as the University of Wales Institute of Science and Technology (UWIST), also in Cardiff. In 1971, St David's College (now part of the University of Wales: Trinity Saint David), Wales' oldest degree-awarding institution, suspended its own degree-awarding powers and entered the University of Wales.

A financial crisis in the late eighties caused UWIST and University College Cardiff to merge in 1988, forming the University of Wales College Cardiff (UWCC). In 1992, the university lost its position as the only university in Wales when the Polytechnic of Wales became the University of Glamorgan (now part of the new University of South Wales).

=== Re-organisation ===
The university was composed of colleges until 1996, when the university was reorganised with a two-tier structure of member institutions in order to absorb the Cardiff Institute of Higher Education (which became the University of Wales Institute, Cardiff (UWIC), now known as Cardiff Metropolitan University) and the Gwent College of Higher Education (which became the University of Wales College, Newport (UWCN)). The existing colleges became constituent institutions, and the two new member institutions became university colleges. In 2003, both of these colleges became full constituent institutions and in 2004, UWCN received permission from the Privy Council to change its name to the University of Wales, Newport.

Cardiff University (which had been known briefly as the University of Wales, Cardiff, between 1996 and 1999) and the University of Wales College of Medicine (UWCM) merged on 1 August 2004. The merged institution, known as Cardiff University, ceased to be a constituent institution and joined a new category of 'Affiliated/Linked Institutions'. While the new institution continued to award University of Wales degrees in medicine and related subjects, students joining Cardiff from 2005 to study other subjects were awarded Cardiff University degrees.

At the same time, the university admitted four new institutions. Thus, North East Wales Institute of Higher Education (NEWI), Swansea Institute of Higher Education and Trinity College, Carmarthen (who were all previously Associated Institutions) along with the Royal Welsh College of Music & Drama (which was previously a Validated Institution) were admitted as full members of the university on 27 July 2004.

The Royal Welsh College of Music & Drama subsequently left the university in January 2007. More changes followed in September 2007 when the university changed from a federal structure to a confederation of independent institutions, allowing those individual institutions which had gained the status of universities in their own right to use the title of university – these institutions are Aberystwyth University, Bangor University, Glyndŵr University (formerly the North East Wales Institute of Higher Education (NEWI)), Swansea Metropolitan University and Swansea University.

In November 2008, Aberystwyth, Bangor and Swansea Universities decided to exercise their right to register students to study for their own awarded degrees.

=== Scandal and merger ===
In 2010 the university broke its links with a Malaysian college after it was discovered its director had bogus qualifications, while a Thai institution linked to the university was found to be operating illegally. In June 2011, a report from the Quality Assurance Agency found that the university had not run the necessary checks on institutes delivering courses it validated, and instructed it to review all of its validation arrangements. In October, the university announced that it would cease validating courses, just before news broke that one of its affiliated colleges in London was involved in a visa fraud. This led to calls from the vice chancellors of the universities of Aberystwyth, Bangor, Cardiff, Glamorgan and Swansea for the University of Wales to be wound up.

It was announced later in October that the University of Wales would be "effectively abolished", and merged into the University of Wales Trinity Saint David (UWTSD), which itself merged with Swansea Metropolitan University on 1 August 2013. In August 2017, a deed of union was approved by the University of Wales and UWTSD, which integrated the two universities into a single functional body prior to a full legal constitutional merger; as of February 2020 this full merger has not been finalised. As part of the work towards merger, custody of the university's Gregynog Hall and its estate was transferred to the newly created Gregynog Trust in July 2019.

== Central services ==
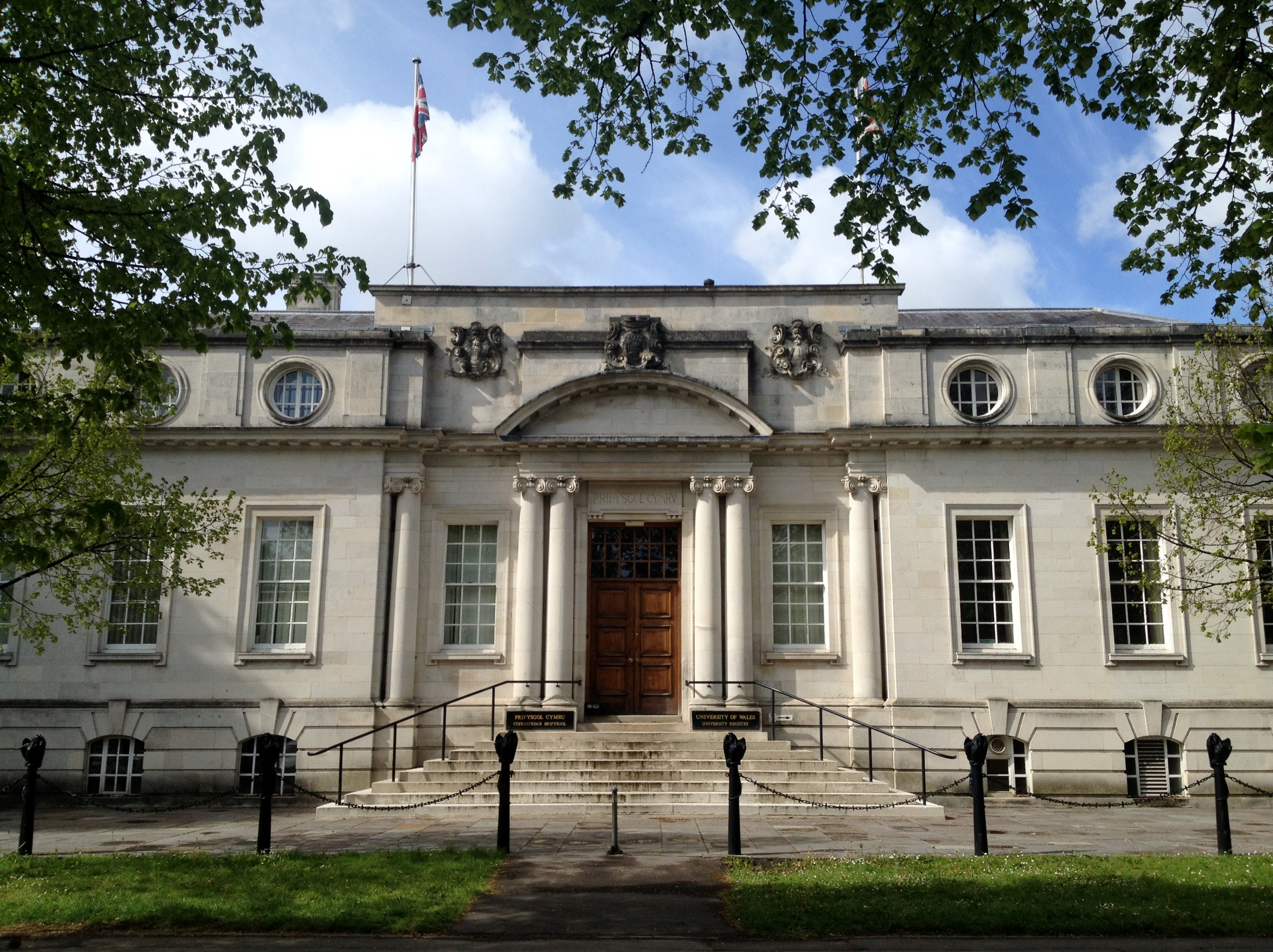
The University of Wales registry building, Cathays Park

The administrative office of the University of Wales is located in Cardiff's Civic Centre. In addition to its work with the accredited institutions in Wales, the university also validates schemes of study at some 130 centres in the UK and across the world, though it is currently in the process of bringing this current validation model to a close. It runs a highly rated research centre, the Centre for Advanced Welsh and Celtic Studies (incorporating the Welsh Dictionary Unit), which is adjacent to the National Library of Wales in Aberystwyth. The first edition of Geiriadur Prifysgol Cymru (The University of Wales Dictionary), which has the same status for Welsh as the OED does for English, was completed in 2002, eighty-two years after it had been started. The University of Wales Press was founded in 1922 and publishes around seventy books a year in both English and Welsh. The university also has a study and conference centre at Gregynog, near Newtown.

== Former colleges and member institutions ==
Former colleges and member institutions:

| Current name | Former names | Established | Joined | Left | Location |
|---|---|---|---|---|---|
| Aberystwyth University | University College Wales; University of Wales, Aberystwyth | 1872 | 1893 | 2007 | Aberystwyth |
| Bangor University | University College of North Wales; University of Wales, Bangor | 1884 | 1893 | 2007 | Bangor |
| Cardiff University | University College South Wales and Monmouthshire; University College Cardiff | 1883 | 1893 | 1988 (merger) | Cardiff |
| Cardiff University | Welsh College of Advanced Technology; University of Wales Institute of Science and Technology | 1866 | 1968 | 1988 (merger) | Cardiff |
| Cardiff University | University of Wales College of Cardiff; University of Wales, Cardiff | 1988 (merger) | 1988 (merger) | 2004 (merger) | Cardiff |
| Cardiff University | University of Wales College of Medicine | 1931 | 1931 | 2004 (merger) | Cardiff |
| Cardiff Metropolitan University | South Glamorgan Institute of Higher Education; Cardiff Institute of Higher Education; University of Wales Institute Cardiff | 1865 | 1996 | 2011 | Cardiff |
| University of South Wales | Gwent College of Higher Education; University of Wales College, Newport; University of Wales, Newport | 1841 | 1996 | 2013 | Newport |
| University of South Wales | Cardiff College of Music; Welsh College of Music & Drama; Royal Welsh College of Music & Drama | 1949 | 2004 | 2007 | Cardiff |
| University of South Wales | (Also takes in the University of Glamorgan, which was never part of the University of Wales) | | | | |
| Swansea University | University College Swansea; University of Wales, Swansea | 1920 | 1920 | 2007 | Swansea |
| University of Wales Trinity Saint David | St David's College, Lampeter; University of Wales, Lampeter | 1822 | 1971 | 2010 | Lampeter |
| University of Wales Trinity Saint David | Trinity College, Carmarthen; Trinity University College | 1848 | 2004 | 2010 | Carmarthen |
| University of Wales Trinity Saint David | West Glamorgan Institute of Higher Education; Swansea Institute of Higher Education; Swansea Metropolitan University | 1853 | 2004 | 2008 | Swansea |
| Wrexham University | Wrexham School of Science and Art; North East Wales Institute; Glyndŵr University; Wrexham Glyndŵr University | 1887 | 2004 | 2008 | Wrexham |

In September 2007, three universities applied for a change to their royal charters to give them the power to award their own degrees, instead of University of Wales degrees. Aberystwyth University, Bangor University, and Swansea University now all award their own degrees.

The University of Wales Trinity Saint David (UWTSD) already had its own degree awarding powers, inherited from Saint David's College, Lampeter, which were put into abeyance when Lampeter joined the University of Wales in 1971. From then on, Lampeter awarded Wales degrees but its own licences and diplomas. When the merger between UWTSD and the University of Wales is complete, the new unified institution will award degrees under the historic 1828 royal charter of Saint David's College.

Cardiff University and the University of Wales College of Medicine were full members of the University of Wales but left following their merger in 2004. The merged institute awarded its own degrees to students admitted since 2005, except in medicine and related subjects which continued to be awarded University of Wales degrees until 2011. Cardiff University had previously merged with the University of Wales Institute of Science and Technology, another college of the University of Wales, in 1988.

The Royal Welsh College of Music & Drama became a full member of the University of Wales in 2004 having awarded degrees validated by the university since the 1970s, but left in 2007, when it merged with the University of Glamorgan, although retaining its separate identity. The University of Glamorgan subsequently merged with the University of Wales, Newport, another former member of the University of Wales, in 2013 to form the University of South Wales

=== Former validated institutions ===
A number of institutions were not accredited by the university, but had some of their courses validated by it. There was some publicity and questioning of the quality of these external courses, and in October 2011, in response to changes in higher education in Wales, including the university's merger, the university announced that it would launch a new academic strategy which would see the institution only award degrees to students on courses designed and fully controlled by the university. All existing students at validated institutions are able to continue the remainder of their studies for a University of Wales award and will have continuous support.

== List of vice-chancellors of the University of Wales ==
The appointment of Vice-Chancellor of the University of Wales is held by a head of one of its constituent colleges/universities.

- 1895 to 1896: John Viriamu Jones, first Principal of the University College of South Wales and Monmouthshire; first incumbent; first term
- 1896 to 1897: Henry Reichel, first Principal of the University College of North Wales; first term
- 1897 to 1898: Thomas Francis Roberts, Principal of the University College of Wales; first term
- 1898 to 1900: John Viriamu Jones; second term
- 1900 to 1901: Henry Reichel; second term
- 1901 to 1903: Thomas Francis Roberts; second term
- 1903 to 1905: Ernest Howard Griffiths, Principal of University College, Cardiff; first term
- 1905 to 1907: Henry Reichel; third term
- 1907 to 1909: Thomas Francis Roberts; third term
- 1909 to 1911: Ernest Howard Griffiths; second term
- 1911 to 1913: Henry Reichel; fourth term
- 1913 to 1915: Thomas Francis Roberts; fourth term
- 1915 to 1917: Ernest Howard Griffiths; third term
- 1917 to 1921: Henry Reichel; fifth term
- 1925 to 1926: Franklin Sibly, Principal of University College, Swansea
- 1926 to 1927: Henry Reichel; sixth term
- 1929 to 1931: Henry Stuart Jones, Principal of the University College of Wales
- 1933 to 1935: Emrys Evans, Principal of the University College of North Wales; first term
- 1935 to 1937: Frederick Rees, Principal of University College Cardiff; first term
- 1937 to 1939: Ifor Leslie Evans, Principal of the University College of Wales; first term
- 1941 to 1944: Emrys Evans; second term
- 1944 to 1946: Frederick Rees; second term
- 1946 to 1948: Ifor Leslie Evans; second term
- 1948 to 1950: Emrys Evans; third term
- 1950 to 1952: Ifor Leslie Evans; third term
- 1952 to 1954: John Fulton, Principal of University College, Swansea; first term
- 1954 to 1956: Emrys Evans; fourth term
- 1958 to 1959: John Fulton; second term
- 1961 to 1963: Thomas Parry, Principal of the University College of Wales, Aberystwyth
- 1969 to 1971: Frank Llewellyn-Jones, Principal of University College of Swansea
- 1973 to 1975: C. W. L. Bevan, Principal of University College, Cardiff; first term
- 1975 to 1977: Aubrey Trotman-Dickenson, Principal of the University of Wales Institute of Science and Technology; first term
- 1979 to 1981: Robert Walter Steel, Principal of the University College of Swansea
- 1981 to 1983: C. W. L. Bevan; second term
- 1983 to 1985: Aubrey Trotman-Dickenson; second term
- 1985 to 1987: Gareth Owen, Principal of the University College of Wales, Aberystwyth
- 1989 to 1991: Eric Sunderland, Principal of the University College of North Wales/Vice-Chancellor the University of Wales, Bangor
- 1991 to 1993: Aubrey Trotman-Dickenson; third term
- 1993 to 1995: Kenneth O. Morgan, Principal/Vice-Chancellor of University College of Wales, Aberystwyth
- 2007 to 2011: Marc Clement, Chief Executive of the University of Wales
- 2011 to 2023: Medwin Hughes, Vice-Chancellor of the University of Wales, Trinity Saint David

== See also ==
- Academic dress of the University of Wales
- List of modern universities in Europe (1801–1945)
- International University of Malaya-Wales

== Bibliography ==
Official histories of the University

- The University of Wales: A Historical Sketch D. Emrys Evans, University of Wales Press, Cardiff, 1953. Published to mark the sixtieth anniversary of the University of Wales. It is illustrated with black-and-white photographic plates, and contains appendices listing 'Authorities and Officers of the University' and 'Professors and Other Heads of Departments' since 1873.
- The University of Wales: An Illustrated History Geraint H. Jenkins, University of Wales Press, Cardiff. 1993. Published to mark the centenary of the University of Wales.
