= Charles Thomas Whitmell =

English astronomer (1849–1919)

- Born: 10 July 1849; Leeds, Yorkshire, England
- Died: 10 December 1919 (aged 70); Leeds, Yorkshire, England
- Citizenship: United Kingdom
- Education: Leeds Grammar School University of London Trinity College, Cambridge
- Scientific career
- Fields: Education Astronomy

Charles Thomas Whitmell (10 July 1849 – 10 December 1919) was an English astronomer, mathematician and educationalist.

== Early life and education ==
Whitmell was born into a middle-class family in Leeds, Yorkshire, where his father was a principal official of the Bank of England. As a teenage child he was pre-occupied by scientific experiments and investigations – especially in the fields of chemistry, optics, electricity and magnetism. At the age of 14 he was already corresponding with Michael Faraday and Professor John Tyndall. Whitmell was educated at Leeds Grammar School, London University and Trinity College, Cambridge (where he studied under James Clerk Maxwell at the Cavendish Laboratory). His experimental work was on the subject of highly refractive liquids. After leaving Trinity College he earned his living by giving Cambridge University Extension lectures, most notably on 'Light & Spectrum Analysis' (Jan–Apr 1875). From 1877 to 1879 he was employed as an Assistant Master at Tonbridge School, near Sevenoaks, Kent.

== Inspector of schools ==
In July 1879 Whitmell was appointed as one of Her Majesty's Assistant Inspectors of Schools, at first working in the area around Sheffield, and in September 1883 was promoted to Her Majesty's Inspector of Schools (HMI) for the South Wales region, centred on Cardiff. He was associated with a number of reform campaigns, such as those for free education, co-education for boys and girls, recreative night-classes, and changes of the law to allow libraries, museums and other cultural facilities to open on Sundays. He also appeared on the platform at rallies demanding votes for women. After more than 13 years in Wales, he was posted to Leeds in the north of England in early 1897 to take over as HMI there.

== Scientific and astronomical interests ==
In both Cardiff and Leeds Charles Whitmell played a leading role in the burgeoning scientific societies. In Cardiff he was an active member of the Chemical and Geological Societies and was a President of the Cardiff Naturalists' Society. Just before leaving Wales he was nominated as the President of the Astronomical Society of Wales. Upon taking up residence in Leeds he was elected President of the Leeds Geological Society and within a year was chosen unanimously as the President of Leeds Astronomical Society. He was also active at a national level, becoming an elected Council member (and later vice-president) of the British Astronomical Association (BAA, elected 27 November 1895), a Fellow of the Royal Astronomical Society (elected 9 December 1898) and a member of the Société astronomique de France (Astronomical Society of France). Whitmell had a flair for mathematical analysis of curious and unusual scientific problems and it was this characteristic which dominated his published work. Such titles as 'The Maximum Possible Duration for a Total Solar Eclipse', the 'Transit of the Moon across the Earth's disc as seen from Mars', 'Saturn visible through the Cassini Division', and 'a Martian Sundial' became his 'stock in trade'. He also relished the observation and analysis of rare or extreme events such as the green flash at sunset, halos, rainbows and mock suns. He was a regular correspondent of the popular journal, the English Mechanic, wherein he provided detailed answers to a wide variety of queries on physics, astronomy and mathematics, posed by its readers. He also wrote hundreds of papers on astronomy for journals such as the Journal of the BAA, the Observatory Magazine, the Monthly Notices of the RAS, and the journals of the local scientific societies of which he was a member. For a time he was the editor of the Journal & Transactions of Leeds Astronomical Society and ensured that copies of the Journal were seen by amateur and professional astronomers around the world.

== Marriage and later life ==
During a BAA expedition to Navalmoral in Spain to observe the total solar eclipse of 28 May 1900, Whitmell met Lucy Foster (the daughter of Sir William Foster, Bart. (1825–1911)), who was also a member of the expedition. Lucy shared not only a passionate interest in astronomy, but also Whitmell's love of poetry. Lucy was elected to the BAA on 26 February 1902. Charles and Lucy were married on 26 May 1903. Whitmell retired from his job as HMI in 1910. During World War I, Lucy Whitmell gained fame in her own right as the author of the poem Christ in Flanders, which was published by The Spectator magazine in September 1915. It became very popular amongst the troops – eliciting several poetic responses – and was set to music by a number of different composers. Lucy died after a protracted illness on 7 May 1917 and Charles Thomas Whitmell died unexpectedly, after a very brief bout of pneumonia, on 10 December 1919. Whitmell is buried with his wife at Lawnswood Cemetery in north Leeds. His epitaph reads simply: 'Chas. Thos. Whitmell, Astronomer'.

== Works ==
'Colour: An Elementary Treatise', Charles T. Whitmell (Cardiff, 1888)
