= Cardiff Naturalists' Society =

Welsh natural history society

- Formation: 1867; 159 years ago
- Founder: Robert Drane
- Type: Learned society
- Legal status: Charitable incorporated organisation
- Website: www.cardiffnaturalists.org.uk

The Cardiff Naturalists' Society is a natural history and historical society based in Cardiff, Wales. The Cardiff Naturalists' Society was founded in 1867 to promote the study of natural history, geology, and the natural sciences, taking in archaeology and zoology. Its members participate in programmes of field visits and lectures, and the society has strong links with Cardiff museums and academic institutions.

The society is still active and has close links to the Amgueddfa Cymru – National Museum of Wales. The society built a library of over 10,000 volumes through exchange with other organizations worldwide. This library is still in existence and is housed in the National Museum Cardiff

From 1867 to 1986 it published annual Reports and Transactions. These publications contain studies of the botany, zoology, geology, archaeology, history and meteorology of southeast Wales, including historical weather records. More recently it has published a newsletter. Issues from 53 (March 2002) are on-line at the society's website.

Since 2011 the society has provided an annual biosciences prize to the best second-year student fieldwork project in the biosciences department of Cardiff University.

Prominent former members include

- William Adams
- Mary Gillham
- John Berry Haycraft
- Edgar Philip Perman
- Frederick Rees
- Harry Morrey Salmon
- Edwin Seward
- Albert Howard Trow
- Eleanor Vachell (first female president of the society)
- Charles Thomas Whitmell
