= Albert Howard Trow =

Welsh botanist (1863–1939)

Albert Howard Trow FLS
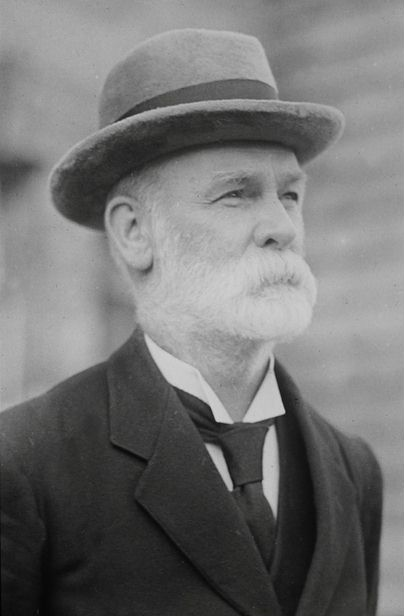
- Born: 28 February 1863; Newtown, Montgomeryshire
- Died: 29 August 1939 (aged 76); Penarth, Vale of Glamorgan
- Education: University College of Wales, Aberystwyth; University of Freiberg; University of London
- Notable work: The Flora of Glamorgan (1906-1911)
- Spouse: Catherine Harry (m. 1889; died 1919)
- Scientific career
- Fields: Botany
- Author abbrev. (botany): Trow

Principal of University College of South Wales and Monmouthshire
- In office 1919 - 1929
- Preceded by: Ernest Howard Griffiths
- Succeeded by: Frederick Rees

President of Cardiff Naturalists' Society
- In office 1907-1908
- Preceded by: John Berry Haycraft
- Succeeded by: Archibald Brown
- In office 1920
- Preceded by: Harry Edgar Salmon
- Succeeded by: Daniel Sibbering-Jones

Albert Howard Trow (28 February 1863 - 29 August 1939) was a Welsh botanist, known for editing The Flora of Glamorgan (published between 1906 and 1911) as well as for his tenure as principal of University College of South Wales and Monmouthshire (now Cardiff University) from 1919 to 1929.

== Early life and education ==
Trow was born on 28 February 1863 in Newtown, part of the historic county of Montgomeryshire. He was his parents' eldest son, growing up with two brothers and five sisters. He was educated at the British School at Newtown, followed by Normal College, a teacher training college in Bangor, North Wales. Trow worked as a teacher for two or three years before moving to University College of Wales, Aberystwyth to pursue further studies in botany. He also briefly attended University of Freiburg, Germany.

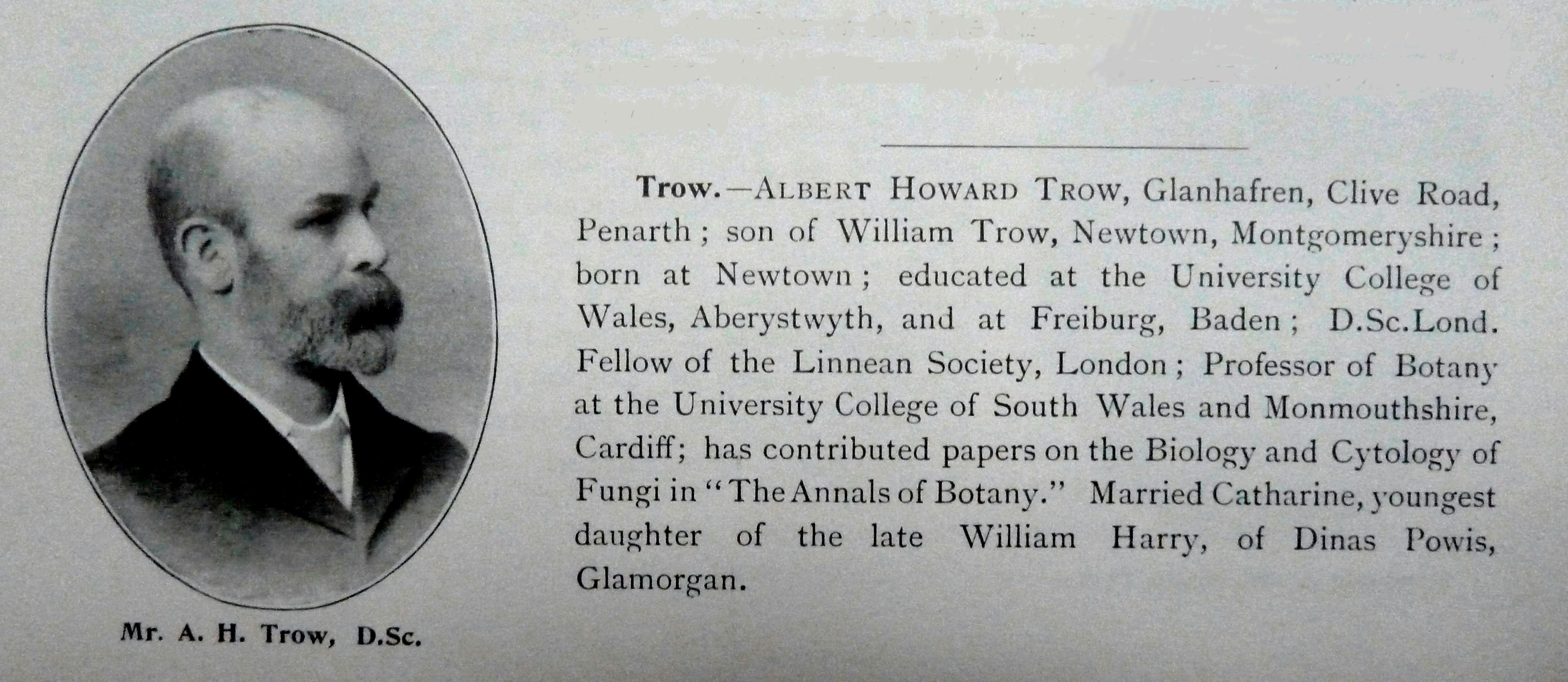
A snippet of Trow's biography in Jenkins, 1907.

== Career ==
Trow was appointed as a tutor and demonstrator in botany at University College, Cardiff in 1892, where he was later promoted to Professor (1905 - 1918) and head of department. In 1898, he was elected to fellowship of the Linnean Society of London. The following year, he gained a DSc from University of London.

Trow was appointed as principal of University College, Cardiff in 1919 and held this position until 1929.

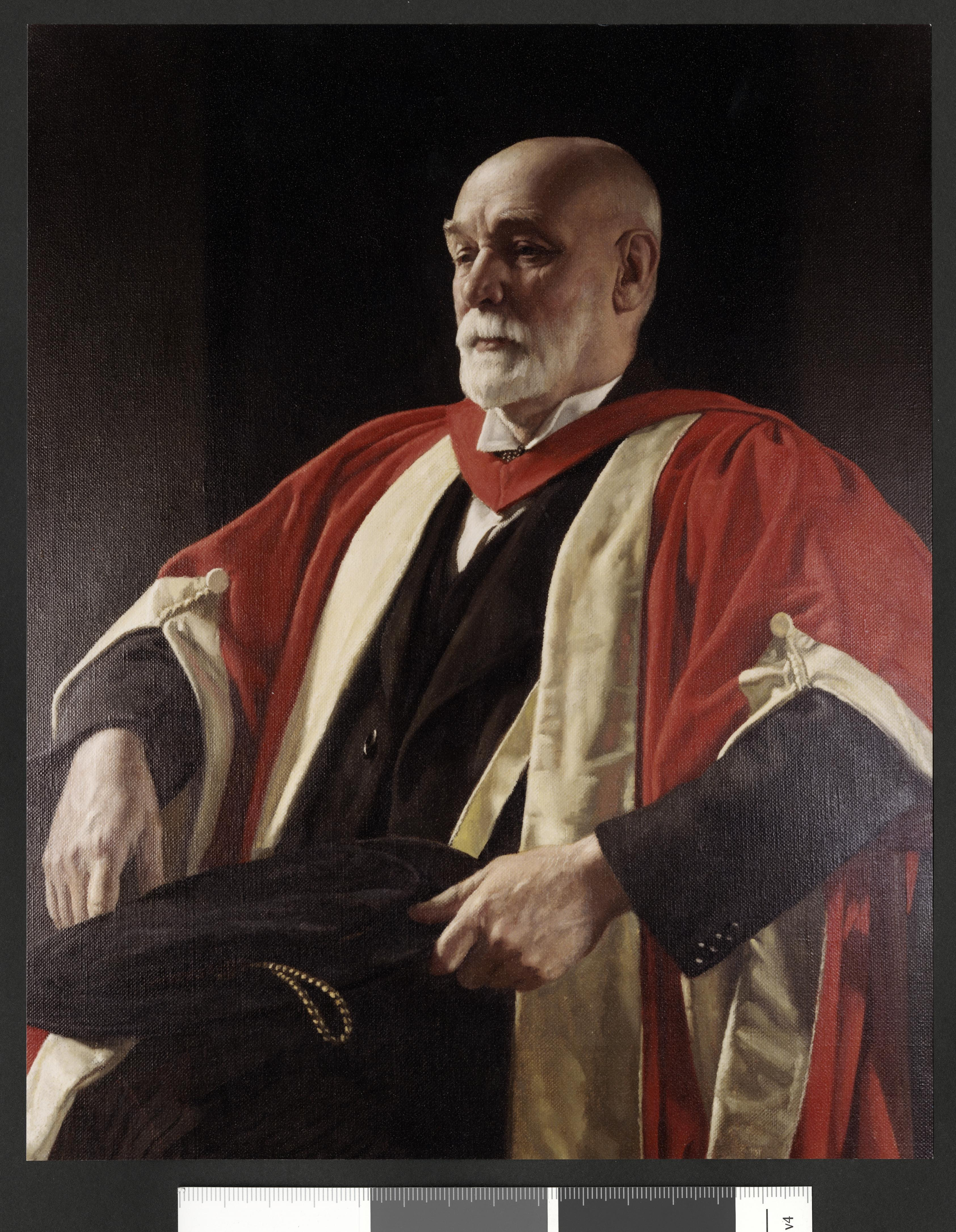
Official portrait painting of A. H. Trow as principal of University College, Cardiff by Harold Knight

During his career, Trow was an active member of many learned societies. He joined Cardiff Naturalists' Society in 1890 and went on to serve as its 35th and 47th president in 1908 and 1920, respectively. It was through this society that Trow worked on The Flora of Glamorgan, which he edited while Eleanor Vachell and her father, Charles Tanfield Vachell, acted as secretaries and recorders. Trow was also a member of the Botanical Society and Exchange Club of the British Isles.

== Personal life ==
In 1889, Trow married the former Miss Catherine Harry, who died in 1919. The pair had no children of their own. However, Trow helped raise his nephew, the son of one of his sisters, Ernest Llewellyn Rees, who lived with Trow in his home in Penarth. Rees was a second lieutenant in the Royal Regiment of Artillery during World War I and was killed in action in Flanders on 22 October 1918.

During Trow's time at Cardiff Naturalists' Society, he worked closely with Eleanor Vachell and was said to have encouraged her pursuit in botany. When Trow died on 29 August 1939, Vachell wrote his obituary on behalf of their society.

== Published works ==
- Cardiff Naturalists' Society (1911). Trow, A.H. (ed.). The flora of Glamorgan, including the spermaphytes & vascular cryptogams, with index. Cardiff: W. Lewis.
- Trow, A.H.; Brown, D.J.A. (1933). A short history of the University College of South Wales and Monmouthshire, Cardiff 1883 to 1933. Cardiff: Western Mail & Echo.
