= Edgar Philip Perman =

Edgar Philip Perman (Jan 1866–May 1947) was an assistant professor of Chemistry at University College Cardiff and Monmouthshire. He was the 40th president of Cardiff Naturalists' Society, in 1913. In 1891, he obtained is Doctor of Science in Chemistry.

== Bibliography ==
- The Direct Synthesis of Ammonia; Proc. R. Soc. Lond. A May 24, 1905 76:167-174
- Determination of Vapour-Pressure by Air-Bubbling; Proc. R. Soc. Lond. A May 24, 1905 76:174-176 (with John Hughes Davies)
- The elastic constants of glass; 1927 Proc. Phys. Soc. 40 186-192 (with William Donald Urry)
- The properties of ammonium nitrate. Part V. The reciprocal salt-pair, ammonium nitrate and potassium chloride; J. Chem. Soc., Trans., 1923, 123, 841 - 849 (with Horace Leonard Saunders)
