= Elizabeth Neesom =

English chartist and reformer (1797/8–1866)

Elizabeth Neesom (c. 1797/98 – 30 November 1866) was a prominent English Radical, Chartist, school teacher, social reformer, and advocate for the rights of women. She was the founding secretary of the London Female Democratic Association (LFDA) and later secretary of the Female Patriotic Radical Association.

== Early life ==
Elizabeth Neesom was born in Cheltenham, Gloucestershire. Little is known of her early life, but by 1830, she had moved to London, where she married Charles Neesom (1785–1861), a tailor from Scarborough, North Yorkshire. She was the stepmother to Charles's daughter from his first marriage, but Elizabeth and Charles had no children of their own.

== Political activism ==
Politically, Elizabeth and Charles were influenced by Thomas Spence, a Radical political thinker. They supported the National Union of the Working Classes (NUWC) and it is likely that Elizabeth also supported the Grand National Consolidated Trades Union, which advocated for the right of women to join trade unions. Elizabeth was described as one of the leading women Chartists in London.

By the mid-1830s, she ran a small school in the back room of a news agency owned by herself and Charles. In 1835, they took in and looked after Allen Davenport, a well-known follower of Thomas Spence, while he was ill. Afterwards, Davenport and Charles Neesom and helped found the East London Democratic Association (ELDA) in 1837, in which Elizabeth was a key member. In April 1839, she was elected the founding secretary of the London Female Democratic Association (LFDA). As secretary of LFDA, she said the group "acknowledg[ed] the sovereignty of the people as our right, as free women (or women determined to be free) to rule ourselves", and called for universal suffrage. She focused on women's education, saying that a lack of this was the main hindrance to women politically and socially. The LFDA supported the People's Charter of 1838 and opposed the factory system and the New Poor Law, which they saw as oppressive. She also campaigned against alcohol and tobacco consumption.

In January 1841, the ELDA re-organised as a branch of the National Charter Association. Elizabeth helped form the Female Patriotic Radical Association and became its secretary. The group discussed female independence but also focused on mutual support among its members, allocating funds to assist those who were ill or to support the families of jailed Chartists. Elizabeth also conducted an adult women's school before each meeting.

In January 1840, during a crackdown on Chartists, Charles was arrested for sedition and conspiracy. The couple faced significant financial hardship during this period, as their possessions were seized, and Charles was imprisoned. Financially, Elizabeth relied heavily on the income from her school.

The charges against Charles were later dropped, and the couple continued their political activism. In October 1840, Charles and Elizabeth both led temperance groups. However, the mid-1840s brought internal divisions within the Chartist movement, leading to a decline in their influence. Charles was expelled from the National Charter Association, and the Elizabeth's temperance group likely disbanded. The couple struggled to maintain their various businesses amid increasing opposition.

In the late 1840s, Elizabeth and Charles became vegetarian, seeing it as a key part of their Radical beliefs. They joined the Vegetarian Society and promoted hydropathy (water cure) as a form of alternative medicine.

== Later life and death ==
The couple continued their reformist activities until Charles's death in 1861. Elizabeth continued to live in Bethnal Green until her death on 30 November 1866, aged 68. She was buried in Victoria Park Cemetery, Hackney.
