= Reports and Transactions, Cardiff Naturalists' Society =

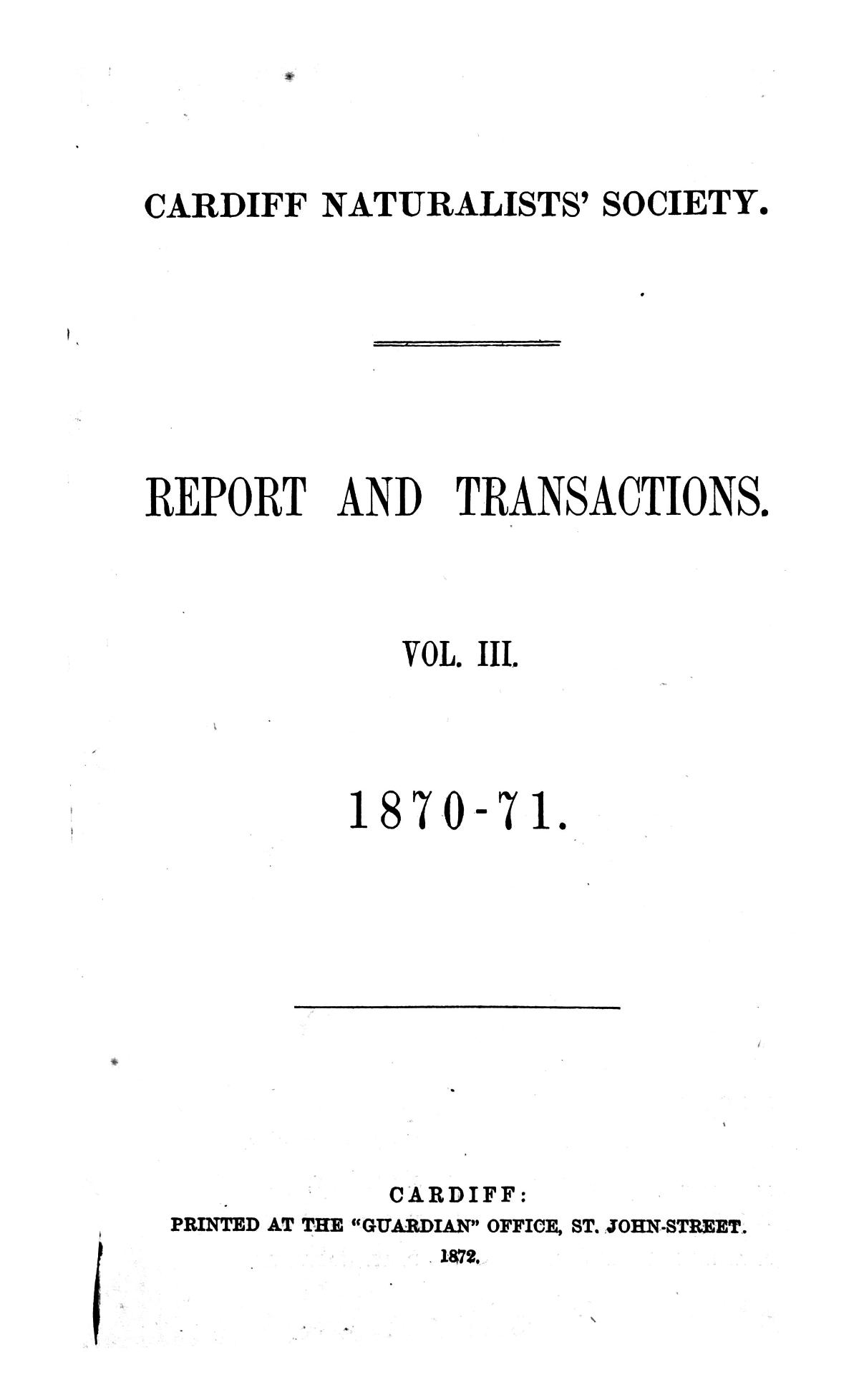
- Reports and transactions; Cardiff Naturalists' Society (Welsh Journal)
- Discipline: Natural sciences, archaeology
- Language: English

Publication details
- History: 1867–1986
- Publisher: Cardiff Naturalists' Society (Wales, United Kingdom)
- Frequency: Annually

Standard abbreviations
- ISO 4: Rep. Trans. Cardiff Nat.' Soc.

Indexing
- ISSN: 0308-3896

Links
- Welsh Journals Online

Reports and Transactions of the Cardiff Naturalists' Society was an annual scientific journal published by the Cardiff Naturalists' Society, containing scholarly articles on geology, archaeology, natural history, and meteorology, as well as book reviews and society notes. The title started in 1867 and ceased publication in 1986. It is being digitized by the Welsh Journals Online project at the National Library of Wales. Scans of volumes 32 to 100 (1899–1986) are currently available.

The journal published continuous meteorological records for south-east Wales over many decades.
