= Andrew Long =

Australian geophysicist

- Born: 7 March 1970 (age 56)
- Education: University of Western Australia; Stanford University
- Occupation: Geophysicist

Andrew S. Long (born 1970) is an Australian geophysicist. He has a PhD in geophysics (1996) from the University of Western Australia, and a post-doctoral term at Stanford University. He is a leader in the application of geophysical technologies to exploration for oil and gas in marine areas, and has written and presented several papers at the Society of Exploration Geophysicists (SEG), the European Association of Geoscientists and Engineers (EAGE), the Australian Society of Exploration Geophysicists (ASEG), the Australian Petroleum Production & Exploration Association (APPEA) and many other international conventions and journals.

Awards include the 1992 Alumni Medal award for outstanding post-graduate from Curtin University of Technology, ASEG Best Presentation (1994), ASEG Best Paper (2004), Indonesian Petroleum Association (IPA) Best Paper Professional for Geophysics and Formation Evaluation (2009) and APPEA Best Oral Presentation (2014). Early leader in the application of satellite altimetry technology to the mapping of the marine gravitational field in the early 1990s, the application of modelling methods to 3D seismic survey planning, the development of High-Density 3D (HD3D) technology for seismic exploration, the introduction of Multi-Azimuth and Wide-Azimuth 3D technology into the Asia-Pacific region, the introduction of Dual-Sensor Streamer technology to the oil and gas industry., the development and commercialization of the Multi-Level Source solution for 'broadband' seismic, the development of the Simultaneous Long Offset method for efficiently acquiring ultra-long offset marine seismic surveys, and the adaptation of Separated Wavefield Imaging to improve marine seismic survey efficiency. His formalization of the design of wide-tow multisource shooting fundamentals has enabled 3D marine seismic surveys to simultaneously improve shallow seismic resolution and maximize survey efficiency, and his method is universally applied to both renewable energy development and oil and gas exploration.

He has lectured extensively on the applications of 'broadband' seismic technologies, with particular emphasis upon ultra-low frequency benefits and challenges, providing professional courses on behalf of the EAGE and SEG. Versions of the 2009 Multi-Level Source paper were awarded Best Presentation awards at the Indonesian Petroleum Association (IPA) and SEG annual meetings, and the paper titled Low Frequency Seismic: The Next Revolution in Resolution was awarded Best Presentation at the 2014 annual APPEA meeting.

In 2009 he was honored as the inaugural Honorary Lecturer for Pacific South for the Society of Exploration Geophysicists, the largest international professional society for the geophysical community.
