= Andy Long (academic) =

Vice-chancellor university

Andy Long is an English academic who is the Vice-Chancellor and Chief Executive of Northumbria University, the fifth person to hold this role in the institution’s history.

Prior to becoming Vice-Chancellor, he was a member of staff at the University of Nottingham, where he served as Provost and Deputy Vice-Chancellor. Previously he was Dean and then Pro Vice-Chancellor for the Faculty of Engineering from 2011 to 2018.

He holds a BSc in Applied Mathematics from the University of Warwick, an MSc in Computer Integrated Engineering from Loughborough University, and a PhD in Mechanical Engineering from the University of Nottingham.

== Research areas and career ==
Long’s research interests are on the design and manufacture of polymer composites for demanding applications particularly in the aerospace, automotive and energy sectors.

Long was also Chair of the Executive Management Group for Midlands Innovation a partnership between Central England universities He has over 350 publications including around 130 refereed journal papers, co-authored/edited three textbooks on polymer composites, supervised over 30 successful PhD students, and been principal investigator for research grants totalling around £33million.

== Awards ==
- In 2006, Long was awarded the Institute of Materials, Minerals and Mining (IoMMM) Rosenhain Medal in recognition of distinguished achievement in materials science.
- In 2020, he was awarded the IoMMM Leslie Holliday Prize for significant contribution to the field of composite materials.
- In 2019, he was elected Fellow of the Royal Academy of Engineering. In 2014 he was inducted as a SAMPE Fellow for significant contributions in materials and process engineering technology.
