= Ifor Leslie Evans =

Welsh academic (1897–1952)

Ifor Leslie Evans (17 January 1897 – 31 May 1952) was a Welsh academic and Principal of the University College of Wales Aberystwyth from 1934 until 1952.

== Background ==
The son of Welsh musician William John Evans, Ivor Leslie Evans received his education at Wycliffe College, Stonehouse before going on to study in France and Germany. While in Germany he was interned in Ruhleben prison for the duration of the First World War. It was here that he learned the Welsh language, and changed his name from Ivor to Ifor.

Following the war, and a brief foray into the Swansea coal trade, he went up to St John's College, Cambridge, where he took a first in history and economics. He was subsequently elected the Whewell Scholar of International law. While a Lecturer and Fellow at St John's from 1923 until 1934, he sat on the League of Nations commission reporting on the economic circumstances of Austria, and also served on the staff of The Economist.

== Principal ==
In 1934, Evans succeeded Sir Henry Stuart-Jones as Principal of the University College of Wales, Aberystwyth. The College underwent many development in the 18 years Evans was principal – the second longest term to date. The College debt he inherited was reduced substantially and benefactors were attracted. Furthermore, plans for building on the Penglais campus were realised: Pantycelyn opened in 1952, and a block in the Penbryn halls is named in his honour. He is also credited with strengthening relations between the staff and students at the College. He was actively involved with the University of Wales, serving as Vice-Chancellor on three occasions, and chairing the Press board and estates committee.

== Offices held ==
Academic offices
Preceded by Sir Henry Stuart-Jones	Principal of the University College of Wales Aberystwyth; 1934–1952	Succeeded by Goronwy Rees
