= Emrys Evans =

Welsh classicist and university principal (1891–1966)

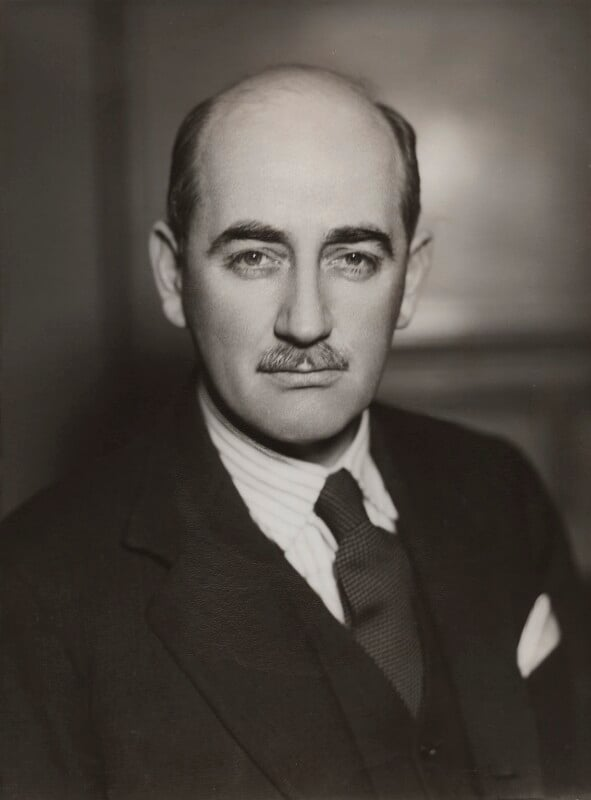
Evans in 1942

Sir David Emrys Evans (29 March 1891 – 20 February 1966) was a Welsh classicist and university principal.

== Life ==
Evans, from Clydach, Glamorgan, was educated at Ystalyfera County School, before going on to University College, Bangor, and then Jesus College, Oxford, where he obtained a B. Litt. degree. He taught at the secondary school in Pentre from 1918, before becoming assistant lecturer in classics at Bangor.

In 1921, he was appointed as the first professor of classics at Swansea University, and later succeeded Sir Henry Reichel as Principal of Bangor. He also served as Vice-Chancellor of the University of Wales and as deputy chairman of the Boundary Commission for Wales.

In the latter years of the Second World War he served as Chair of the Central Advisory Council for Education (Wales), and also chaired the Schools Broadcasting Council (Wales). He was knighted in 1952 and became a freeman of Bangor on his retirement from the university in 1958. His published works included a translation of Plato's Republic from Greek into Welsh. He died in Bangor on 20 February 1966 at the age of 74.

A hall of residence, Neuadd Emrys Evans was opened at Bangor University in 1966. It was demolished in 2008.

Academic offices
Preceded by Henry Reichel	Principal of the University College of North Wales; 1927 to 1958	Succeeded by Charles Evans (mountaineer)
