= Thomas Francis Roberts =

British academic (1860–1919)

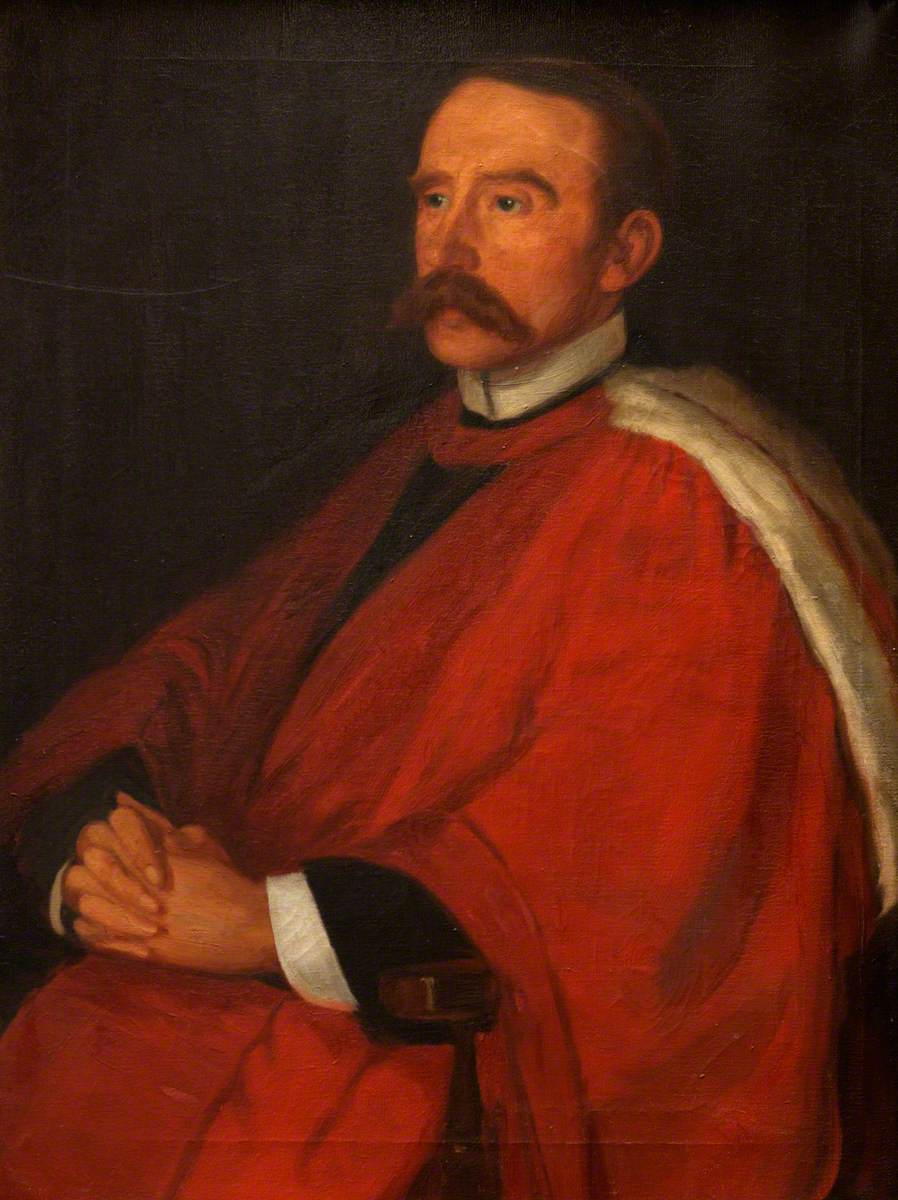
Dr T. F. Roberts Principal of University of Wales, Aberystwyth

Thomas Francis Roberts (1860–1919) was a Welsh academic and second Principal of the University College of Wales, Aberystwyth.

Born at Aberdyfi, he received his education at Tywyn and the UCWA before taking a scholarship to St John's College, Oxford, where he took a first in Classical honour moderations in 1881 and again in literae humaniores two years later. After receiving his Bachelor's degree in 1883, he became the first Professor of Greek at the newly established University College of South Wales and Monmouthshire in Cardiff, South Wales.

In 1891 he succeeded Thomas Charles Edwards at his alma mater, University College Wales, Aberystwyth. He was a founder member, with T. E. Ellis, of the Aberystwyth Old Students' Association in 1892 and was later President in 1910–11.

To date, he is both the youngest-appointed and longest-serving Principal. He was also a key figure in developing the fledgling University of Wales, which was established in 1893.

== Offices held ==
Academic offices
Preceded by Thomas Charles Edwards	Principal of the University College of Wales, Aberystwyth; 1891-1919	Succeeded by John Humphreys Davies
Professional and academic associations
Preceded by C. P. Tremain	President of the Aberystwyth Old Students' Association; 1910–11	Succeeded by Dr T. Campbell James
