= Henry Reichel =

Irish academic administrator (1856–1931)

Sir Henry Reichel
- Born: Henry Rudolf Reichel; October 11, 1856; Belfast, Ireland
- Died: June 22, 1931 (aged 74); Biarritz, France
- Burial place: Whitechurch, Rathfarnham, Ireland
- Other name: Harry Reichel
- Education: Balliol College, Oxford, M.A.
- Occupations: Academic administrator and educator
- Years active: 1880–1931
- Employer(s): Jesus College, Oxford All Souls College, Oxford; University College of North Wales; University of Wales Coleg Harlech

Sir Henry Rudolf Reichel (11 October 1856 – 22 June 1931), was an Irish academic administrator. He was a founder and vice chancellor of the University of Wales and the first principal of University College of North Wales, now Bangor University, serving in this capacity for 43 years. He was also the president of Coleg Harlech.

== Early life ==
Reichel was born in Belfast, Ireland, on 11 October 1856. He was the second son of Mary Brown (née McCrackedn) and Charles Parsons Reichel, professor of ecclesiastical history at Dublin University and Bishop of Meath.

Reichel was educated at Christ's Hospital in Horsham, West Sussex, England. He then attended Balliol College, Oxford, receiving an M.A. in 1875.

== Career ==
"Harry" Reichel was a Fellow at Jesus College, Oxford. He was then had two appointments as a Fellow of All Souls College, Oxford, where he lectured in modern history from 1880 until 1895.

He was appointed the first principal of the University College of North Wales, in Bangor in 1888 when he was 28 years old. His many accomplishments include creating the school of agriculture, the school of forestry, the department of music, and the school of theology. He also raised more than 100,000 pounds for college buildings.

Reichel helped establish the University of Wales in Cardiff, Wales, serving as its vice chancellor for six terms, from 1889 to 1901, 1905 to 1907, 1911 to 1913, 1917 to 1921, and 1926 to 1927. After 43 years, he retired in September 1927 as rector emeritus from the University College of North Wales. He had planned on retiring in the fall of 1924, but extended his service at the request of the Governors of University College of North Wales. He then became president of Coleg Harlech, a new adult education center in Harlech, Gwynedd, Wales.

He was the chairman of the Board of Examinations for Educational Handbook, starting in 1898 and continuing until at least 1913. He was also a member of the Moseley Commission who went to the United States in 1903 and consulted on educational issues in Australia and New Zealand. In New Zealand, he spent the summer of worked on the federal system of the National University of New Zealand and its four colleges as chairman of the Royal Commission of University Education. He was also a member of the Consultative Committee of the New Zealand Board of Education from 1907 to 1915.

== Honors ==
In June 1901, Reichel received an honorary doctorate (LL.D) from the University of Glasgow during the university's 450th jubilee. He was Knighted by King Edward VII in 1907. He received an LL.D. from the University of Wales in July 1928.

== Personal life ==
Reichel married Charity Mary Pilkington on February 1, 1894. She was the daughter of Henry Mulock Pilkington, a Queens Counsel, from Tyrellspass, County Westmeath, Ireland. She died on November 11, 1911.

Reichel was a member of the Savile Club and was a founder of the Bangor Musical Club. He was also a supporter of the Welsh Folk-Song Society. He enjoyed rifle shooting, golf, and cycling. He was elected president of the Welsh League of Nations Union, a grassroots peace movement, in May 1928.

Reichel died on 22 June 1931 while on a holiday at Biarritz, France. He was buried in Whitechurch, Rathfarnham, Ireland.
