= List of principals and vice-chancellors of Bangor University =

The Vice-Chancellor is the chief executive of Bangor University. Prior to its independence from the University of Wales in 2007, the position was known as the Principal.

There have been eleven principals and VCs since 1884.

== Principals (1884-2007) ==
- Henry Reichel, 1884–1927
- David Emrys Evans, 1927–1958
- Charles Evans, 1958–1984
- Eric Sunderland, 1984–1995
- Roy Evans, 1995–2004
- Merfyn Jones, 2004–2007

== Vice-chancellors (2007-present) ==
- Merfyn Jones, 2007–2010
- John G. Hughes, 2010–2018
- Graham Upton, 2018–2019
- Iwan Davies, 2019–2022
- Edmund Burke, 2022–present
