= Michael T. Casey =

Michael Casey OP, FICI, (1902–1997) was an Irish Dominican priest and Chemist. Casey was born in Waterford in 1902. He studied science in University College Dublin, before joining civil service as Assistant State Chemist. Aged 26 he joined the Dominican order and was ordained in 1934, going on to teach science at Newbridge College. In 1936 he was instrumental in the re-foundation of the Chemical Association of Ireland.

In 1957, Casey joined the staff of St. Patrick's College, Maynooth, and in 1960 was appointed Professor of Chemistry. Casey was active with the National Science Museum at Maynooth and he oversaw the completion of the transfer of Nicholas Callan apparatus to the museum. He served as curator of the Museum from 1975 until his death.

Casey was made an Honorary Fellow of the Institute of Chemistry Ireland. He continued to work in the laboratory each afternoon until well into his nineties.

The Rev. Michael Casey Prize for Chemistry is awarded for third year undergraduates by the Dept. of Chemistry in NUI Maynooth.

Casey died on Christmas Day 1997 aged 95 and is buried in Maynooth College Cemetery, next to the famous Maynooth scientist Nicholas Callan.
