= Eeva Leinonen =

Finnish academic and university head

- Born: 1958 (age 67–68); Oulu, Finland
- Known for: President of Maynooth University; Vice-Chancellor of Murdoch University, Perth, Western Australia
- Children: 1

Academic background
- Education: De Montfort University (as Leicester Polytechnic), University of Exeter, Aston University
- Thesis: Assessing the functional adequacy of children's phonological systems (1987)
- Doctoral advisor: Pam Grunwell

Academic work
- Discipline: Linguistics, psychology

President of Maynooth University
- In office 1 October 2021 –
- Preceded by: Philip Nolan

Vice-Chancellor of Murdoch University
- In office April 2016–September 2021
- Preceded by: Richard Higgott (and Andrew Taggart, acting)
- Succeeded by: Andrew Deeks (second of two interim heads)

Eeva Kaarina Leinonen ([ˈe̞ːʋɑ ˈle̞i̯no̞ne̞n]; born 1958; sometimes Eeva Kaarina Leinonen-Davies) is a Finnish educator and educational administrator. Since 1 October 2021, she has been president of Maynooth University in Ireland, having previously headed Murdoch University in Australia.

An academic leader and professor of many years standing in a number of third level institutions, Leinonen works in the areas of linguistics, especially clinical linguistics and pragmatics, and psychology, with research interests including aspects of autistic spectrum disorders, in addition to elements of higher education management and learning.

== Early life and education ==
Leinonen was born in 1958 in Oulu, Finland, one of three children of working-class parents. She and her brothers grew up and attended school there, though she did take a year in Michigan as an exchange student. She pursued higher education, the first in her family's history to do so, opting for UK institutions; she commented later on the challenges involved in studying in a different linguistic environment. She took her bachelor's degree, a B.Sc. in Linguistics and Psychology, at Aston University in Birmingham, followed by an M.Phil. at the University of Exeter; her dissertation, released in 1984, considered, as part of a textual analysis approach, the experience of Finnish learners of English. She then joined the research team of Professor Pamela Grunwell, a specialist in Clinical Linguistics and Phonology at Leicester Polytechnic (later De Montfort University). She pursued a Ph.D. in Clinical Linguistics and her thesis, published in 1987, explored the phonological systems of children.

== Career ==
=== Teaching and management roles ===
Having started teaching and research at Hatfield Polytechnic in the late 1980s, by the 2000s, Leinonen was Professor of Psycholinguistics at what had become in 1992 the University of Hertfordshire; she was also appointed as deputy vice-chancellor there. For part of the same period, she was a private docent - a scholar with the equivalent of two doctoral theses - at the University of Oulu in Finland, working with clinical linguistics. In September 2009, after almost 20 years at Hertfordshire, she joined the faculty at King's College London, where she was Professor of Clinical Linguistics, and was also appointed vice-principal for education, and deputy chairperson of the Academic Board.

In 2012, Leinonen moved to Australia, going directly from King's to the wide campus of the University of Wollongong in New South Wales, 80 km from Sydney, where she took up a role as deputy vice-chancellor, with overall responsibility for education. Succeeding a 42-year veteran academic leader, and joining a new vice-chancellor, Paul Wellings, Leinonen outlined plans to work on student university life, digital learning and community outreach and participation. From April 2016, she moved to become vice-chancellor, the chief officer, of Murdoch University in Perth, Western Australia, after the previous vice-chancellor, Richard Higgott, had departed in October 2014 in controversial circumstances, to be replaced by an acting head, Andrew Taggart, from 2014 to 2016.

=== Murdoch University ===
Leinonen was the first female head of Murdoch University, established in 1973 as the second State university of Western Australia. She took office on 4 April 2016, with the formal investiture, presided over by the Governor of Western Australia, held later in the year. In 2018, her salary, for a university of around 23,000 students, 750 academics and 999 general staff was noted in the press as, at 755,000 Australian dollars, higher than that of Australia’s Prime Minister; the salary rose to 930,000 AUD by 2019, even as staff cuts (the main union feared at least 200 job losses) and a 25 million AUD salary saving were sought.

The university's chancellor, its ceremonial chairperson, praised Leinonen's work when he announced her plans to move to Ireland, but there were also some controversies during her term, most notably around the cessation of most science, technology and mathematics studies as separate degrees in an initiative called "STEM Everywhere", a long-term major increase in online lecturing beyond Covid provisions and the termination of courses in Bahasa Indonesian and other topics. During the term of office, more than 100 faculty members were made redundant and a range of courses were discontinued, including Australian Indigenous Studies and the long-standing Theology programme, which drew some criticism, with staff complaining of a lack of resources to teach scheduled classes, and of funding issues, while the few top executives of the university were awarded extremely high salaries.

=== Maynooth University ===
Leinonen was announced on International Women's Day, in March 2021, as the successor to Philip Nolan as president of Maynooth University, County Kildare, Ireland. She served at Murdoch University for another six months, taking office at Maynooth on 1 October 2021. She became the first female leader of the university, and the third woman to take the full leadership role of an Irish university in the span of under 15 months - an interim appointment at the University of Limerick mid-2020 was followed by the selection of Maggie Cusack to lead the newly-formed Munster Technological University from 1 January 2021, the election of Linda Doyle at Trinity College Dublin, effective 1 August - and Leinonen's commencement was followed a week later by the full appointment of Kerstin Mey as head of the University of Limerick.

=== Recognition ===
Leinonen was awarded an honorary degree, D.Sc. (H.C.), for her services to education, by one of her almae matres, Aston University, in 2018.

== Publications ==
Leinonen has co-authored two books, and contributed articles to others, as well as to journals. The books are:

- Smith, Benita R. and Leinonen, Eeva K. / Clinical Pragmatics: Unravelling the Complexities of Communicative Failure / UK: Nelson Thornes, 1991
- Leinonen, Eeva; Letts, Carolyn; Smith, Benita Rae / Children's pragmatic communication difficulties / UK: London and US: Philadelphia, 2000

== Personal life ==
Leinonen has a daughter, an anthropologist, who lives and works in London. Her husband is Australian, and he and she moved to Australia partly to be with his aging parents. With both her daughter and his two children based in the UK, they were visiting there regularly and she stated that one reason for moving to Ireland was to be nearer all three children, as Australia was no longer a single flight away.

Academic offices
Preceded by Philip Nolan	President of Maynooth University; 2021–	Succeeded by incumbent
Preceded by Richard Higgott (and Andrew Taggart, acting)	Vice-Chancellor of Murdoch University (from 2022 Vice-Chancellor and President); 2016–2021	Succeeded by two interim heads, with Andrew Deeks appointed as of April 2022
