= Philip Nolan (professor) =

Irish academic, physiologist and public administrator

- Born: Dublin, Ireland
- Known for: Chair of the NPHET Epidemiological Modelling Advisory Group; Director General of Science Foundation Ireland; President of Maynooth University
- Children: 2

Academic background
- Education: University College Dublin
- Thesis: Reflex responses to upper airway negative pressure (2003)

Academic work
- Discipline: Physiology

Director General of Science Foundation Ireland
- In office 16 January 2022 – 27 May 2024
- Preceded by: Mark Ferguson
- Succeeded by: Ciarán Seoighe (acting)

President of Maynooth University
- In office August 2011 – October 2021
- Preceded by: John G. Hughes
- Succeeded by: Eeva Leinonen

Philip Nolan is an Irish physiologist, academic and public administrator. He served as the director general of Science Foundation Ireland from 2022 to 2024. He previously served as the chair of NPHET's Irish Epidemiological Modelling Advisory Group from March 2020 to February 2022, president of Maynooth University from August 2011 to October 2021, deputy president of University College Dublin for academic affairs and registrar from 2004 to 2011.

== Early life and education ==
Nolan was born in Dublin, Ireland. He attended University College Dublin and received a Bachelor of Science degree in physiology in 1988, the primary medical degree in 1991 and Doctor of Philosophy degree in 2003. He interned at St Vincent's University Hospital, Dublin, from 1991 to 1992.

== Career ==
Nolan joined the staff of University College Dublin in 1996. He received a UCD President's Research Award in 2000 and a UCD President's Teaching Award in 2002. He served as director of the UCD Conway Institute from 2003 to 2004, at the UCD Health Sciences Centre. Nolan was appointed Deputy President for Academic Affairs and Registrar of University College Dublin in July 2004. He worked with the then president Hugh Brady in the development in undergraduate and graduate education, student administration and information technology services.

On 15 August 2011, Nolan was appointed president of Maynooth University, leaving his position as deputy president of University College Dublin. From March 2020 to February 2022, he served as the chair of the Irish Epidemiological Modelling Advisory Group on the COVID-19 pandemic in the Republic of Ireland. On 8 March 2021, it was announced that Professor Eeva Leinonen, former Vice-Chancellor of Murdoch University, would succeed Nolan as president of Maynooth University from 1 October 2021.

In May 2021, he was elected a member of the Royal Irish Academy.

In October 2021, it was announced that Nolan would become Director General of Science Foundation Ireland (SFI), one of Ireland's main research agencies, with a budget in excess of 200 million euro, in January 2022.

In May 2023, it was announced that he was the chief executive-designate of a new state research agency Research Ireland, which would subsume SFI and the Irish Research Council. The Government appointed a new CEO-designate to replace Nolan, following his dismissal from SFI in May 2024.

=== Misconduct allegations, dismissal and settlement ===
In January 2024, an independent investigation began into reports of misconduct allegations made by staff members against Nolan. The allegations were made by five senior managers of SFI in December 2023. The independent investigation report found that Nolan was not in breach of corporate governance, and no findings of misconduct or bullying were made against him. However, the report concluded that he displayed "inappropriate behaviour" towards the staff concerned, which was at the "upper level and just below bullying" in respect of two senior staff.

In the closing week of May 2024, the board of SFI announced its decision to dismiss Nolan. Later that week, he filed papers for an injunction against that decision. The High Court granted an interim injunction restraining SFI from dismissing Nolan.

On 21 June 2024, the High Court refused to grant additional orders sought by Nolan. It found that the board of SFI were entitled to dismiss the organisation's CEO "for no reason at all" but that a dismissal for misconduct would be subject to certain procedural rules. Noting that the reasons for dismissal were "no doubt connected" with the disruption in the organisation, the judge further noted that there was an issue about the grounds for dismissal to be decided at full trial, while SFI submitted an affidavit that it did not decide to dismiss the CEO because of misconduct. Nolan failed to secure an order allowing him to return to work pending the outcome of the case but he continued to serve as Director General of SFI until the presiding judge made final orders in the case. The case was settled in December 2024, with the SFI issuing a statement noting there were "no findings of misconduct or poor performance" by Nolan and noting the reputational damage caused to both parties.

== Personal life ==
Nolan has two daughters.

Academic offices
Preceded by John G. Hughes	President of the National University of Ireland, Maynooth; 2011–2021	Succeeded by Eeva Leinonen
