= National Science Museum at Maynooth =

National Science and Ecclesiology Museum
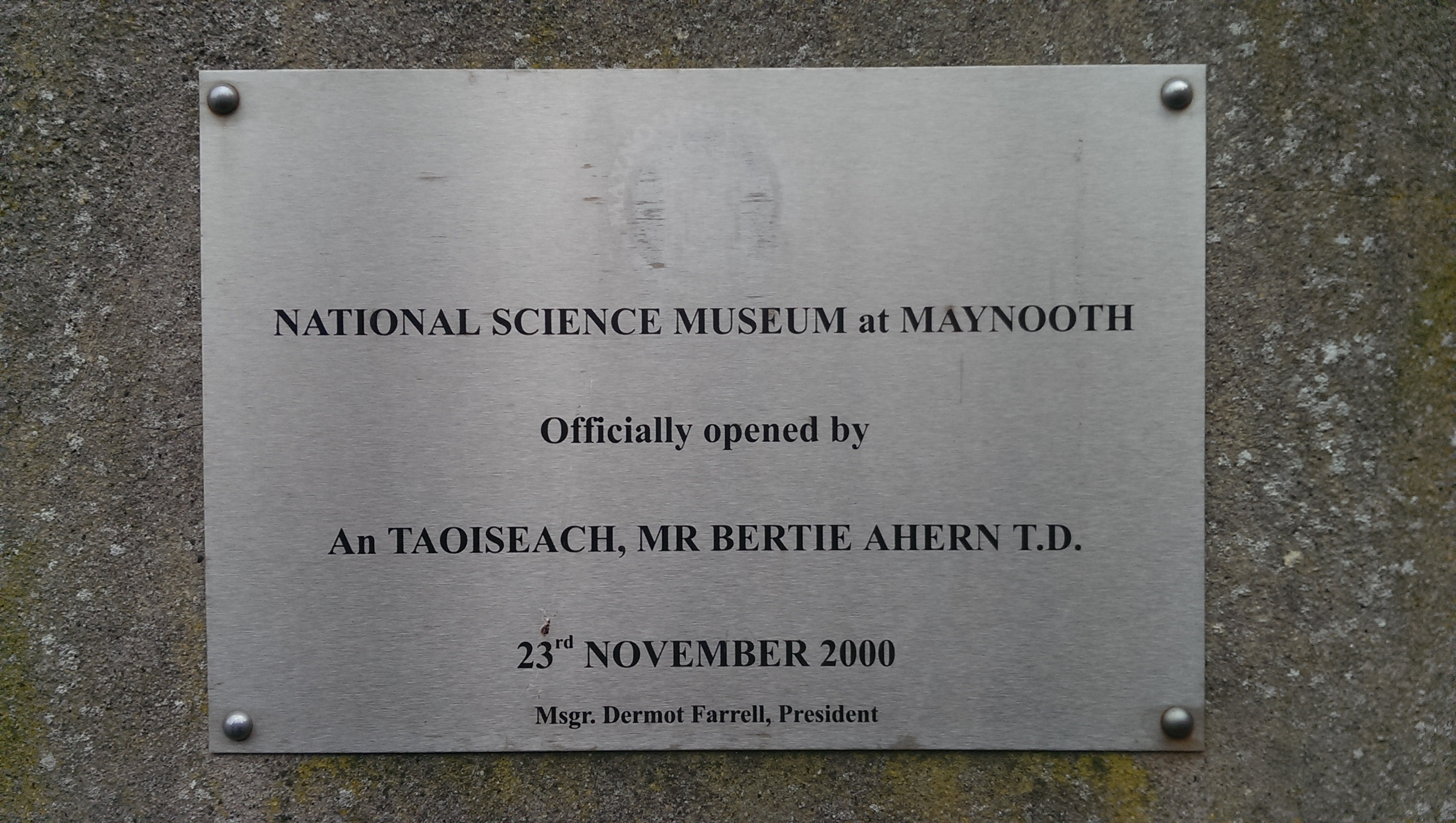
- Plaque at entrance

- Location within Ireland
- Former name: Museum of Ecclesiology
- Established: 1934
- Location: Maynooth, County Kildare, Ireland
- Coordinates: 53.37857°N 6.59857°W
- Type: Science museum Ecclesiology museum
- Public transit access: Maynooth; Dublin Bus routes: C3, C4, C5, C6; Go-Ahead Ireland routes: W6
- Website: maynoothcollege.ie

The National Science and Ecclesiology Museum at Maynooth is a science museum and museum of ecclesiology, located on the joint campus of St Patrick's College, Maynooth and Maynooth University (the southern campus of the university), Ireland. It is an institution of the college, having begun as an ecclesiological museum.

The museum holds various artefacts from the history of science in Ireland (the largest such collection open to the public in Ireland), a large collection of scientific equipment used by Nicholas Callan, and one of two death masks of Irish political leader Daniel O'Connell. The museum was founded in 1934 as the Museum of Ecclesiology but has become more focused on science, partially due to Maynooth's association with Callan.

== History ==
The museum was founded in 1934 as the Museum of Ecclesiology in what was then simply St. Patrick's College, with Dr. William Moran, Professor of Dogmatic Theology, as its first curator. After Moran resigned in 1942, the Very Rev. Dr. Patrick J McLaughlin (then Professor of Experimental Physics and later Vice-President of the College) was appointed as curator. Moran oversaw the transferral of much of Callan's apparatus, which are now on display, into the museum, a process that was completed by his successor, Rev. Dr. Michael Casey.

== Collection ==
The museum has two main collections: a collection of scientific instruments associated with Nicholas Callan and a collection of ecclesiastical artifacts.

The Callan collection includes the first induction coil, invented by Callan in 1836. There are a number of his other induction coils, including his giant induction coil (pictured) which he created in 1845, which produced 600,000 volts. There are two coils in this invention, the primary coil and the secondary coil. Over twenty miles of wires in the induction coil were hand-insulated with bees wax. Callan used seminarians holding hands touching the coil to measure the strength of the current. The current passed through the seminarians and Callan judged its strength by the height the seminarians jumped. He worked with a local blacksmith to create the large electromagnet (pictured) in 1836. The collection contains a number of documents and books, including a royal patent for galvanization.

There is also a large holding of nineteenth century batteries in the museum. Other items in the collection include a Norremberg polariscope, a nineteenth century polarizing microscope, and the first portable GPS device. Navigation instruments are also displayed in the museum, including several octants and sextants. In 1731, the Hadley octant improved in design to become the forerunner of the modern sextant. The octant inscribed with the name 'Yeates' in the collection appears to refer to a George Yeates, active from 1826-1858.

The museum's ecclesiastical collection includes a set of priestly vestments including a set of robes commissioned under the royal patronage of Marie Antoinette. They include an old Ecce Homo (12C) and a leaf of an ivory diptych (14C, Northern France). In addition there are a number of altar stones and a statue of Jesus that was defaced by Cromwellian soldiers during the Siege of Drogheda in 1649.

Some artifacts in the museum's collection

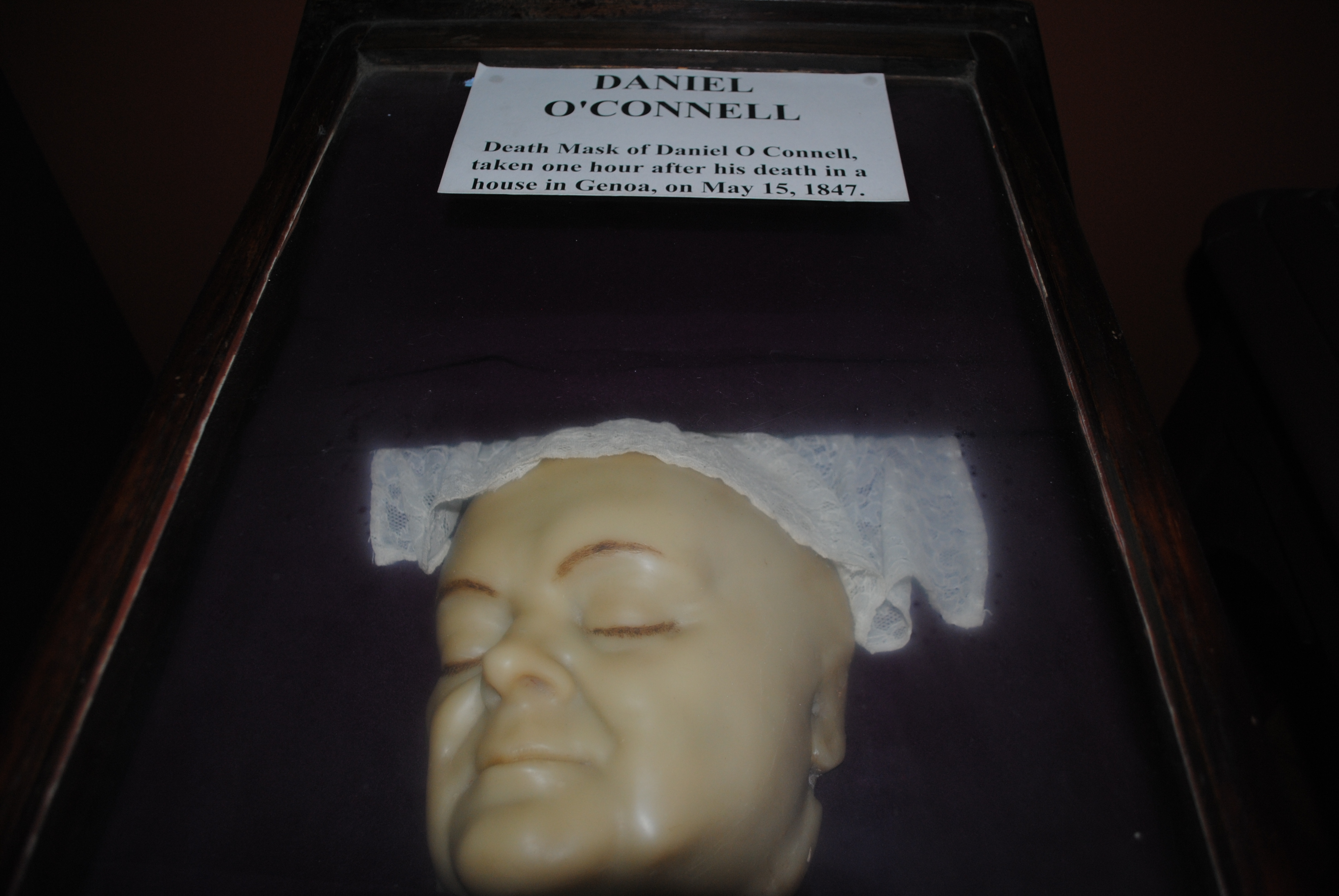
Death mask of Daniel O'Connell (1847)

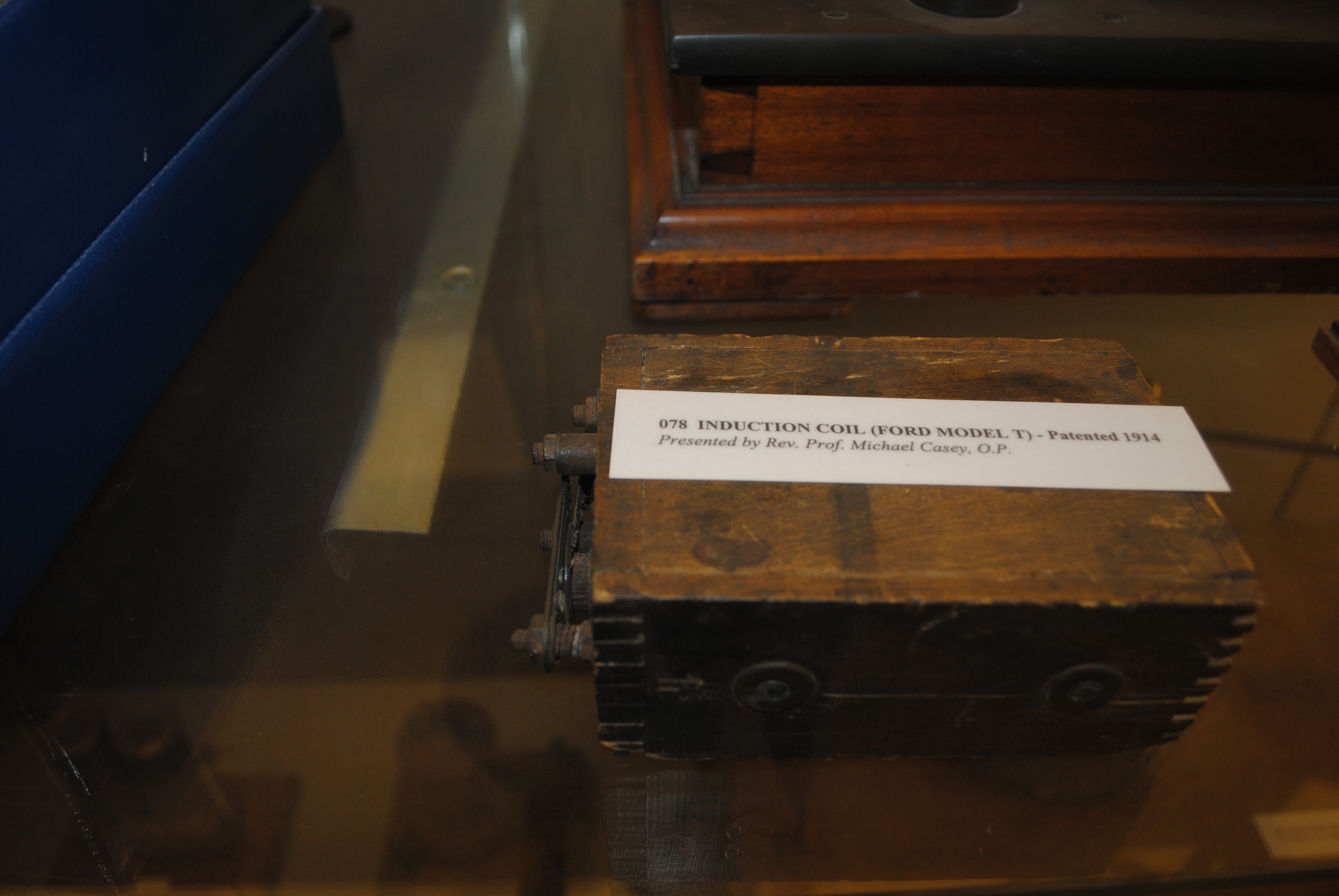
Induction Coil from Ford Model T

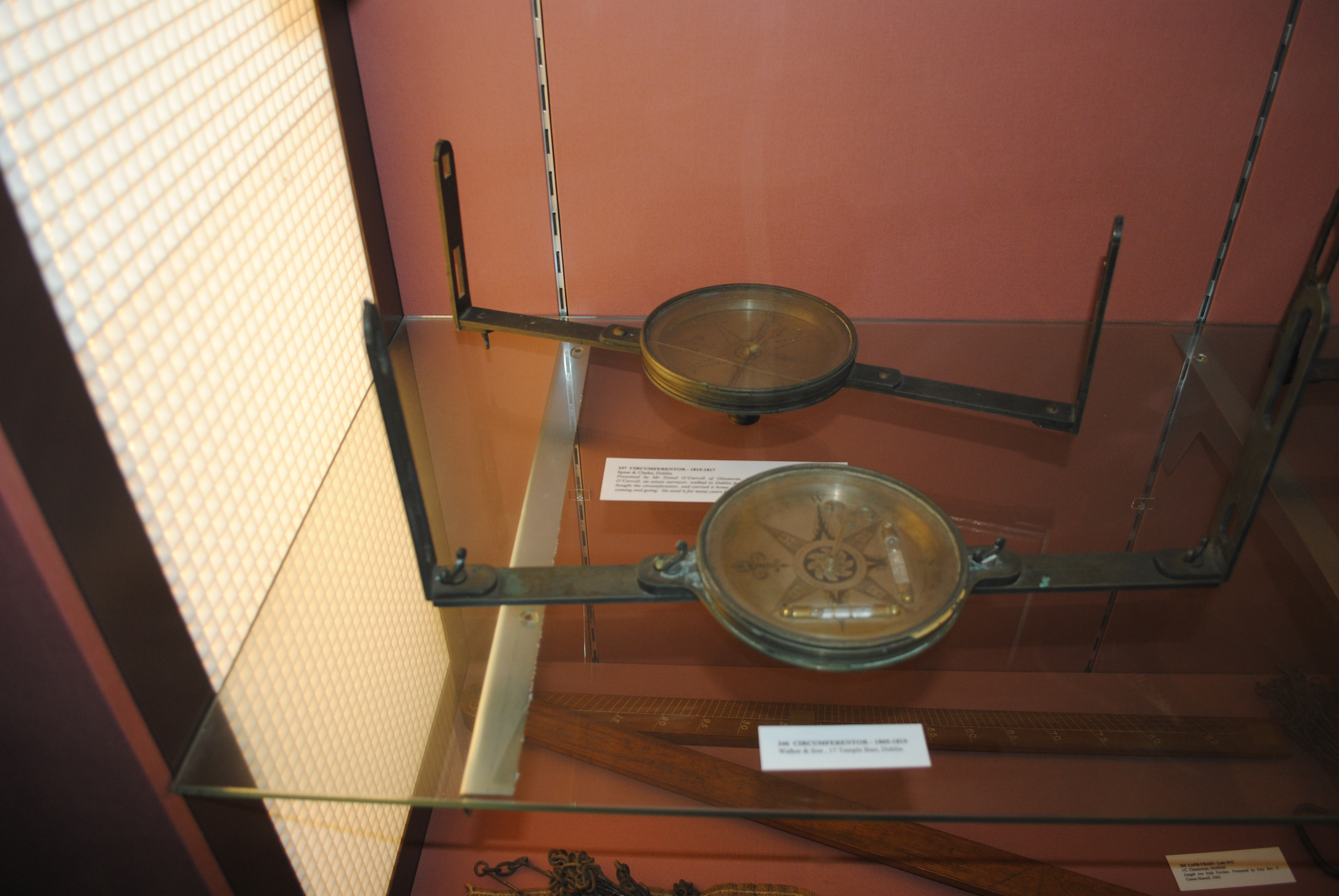
A Circumferentor (1805-1819) at the National Science Museum at Maynooth

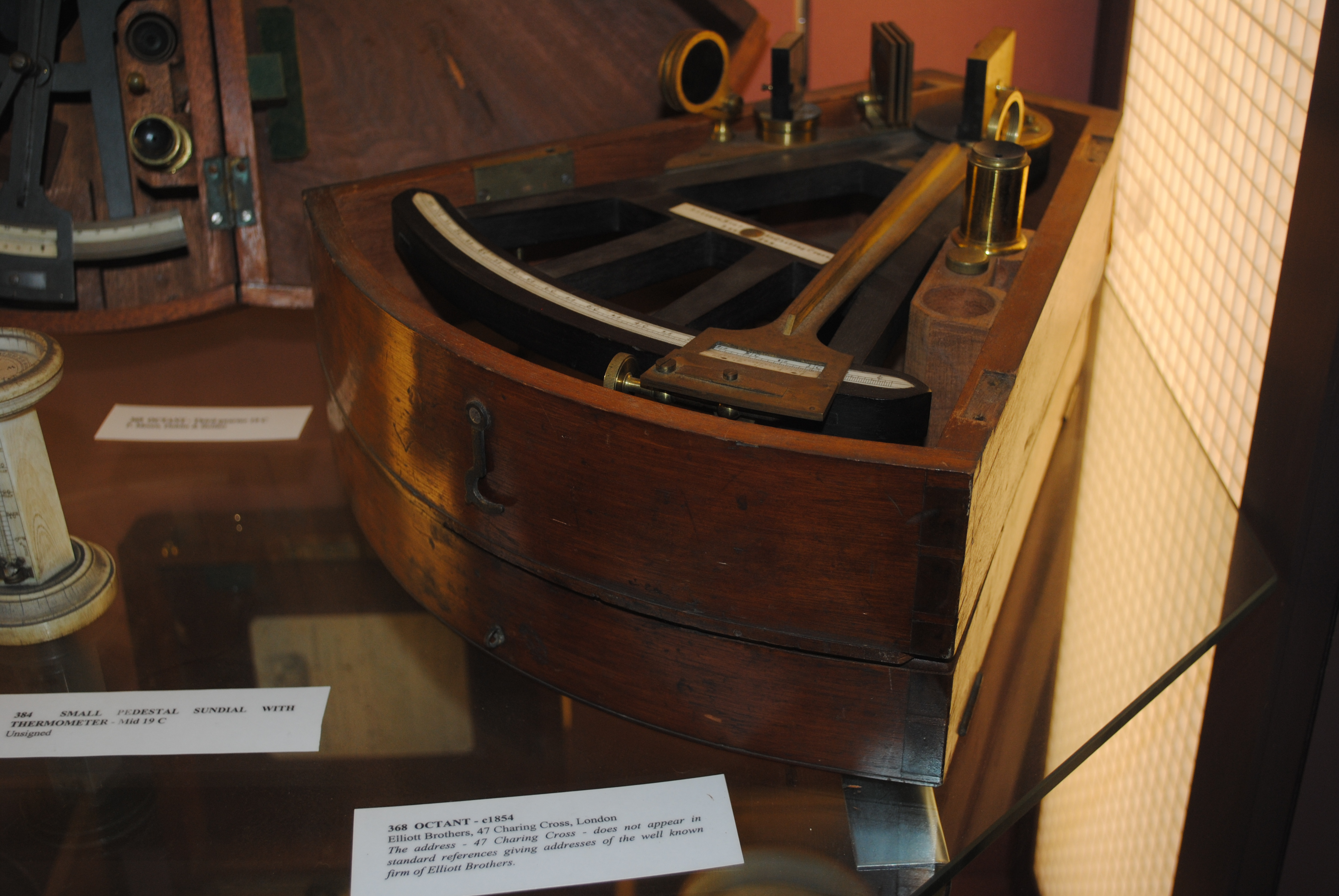
An octant at the National Science Museum at Maynooth

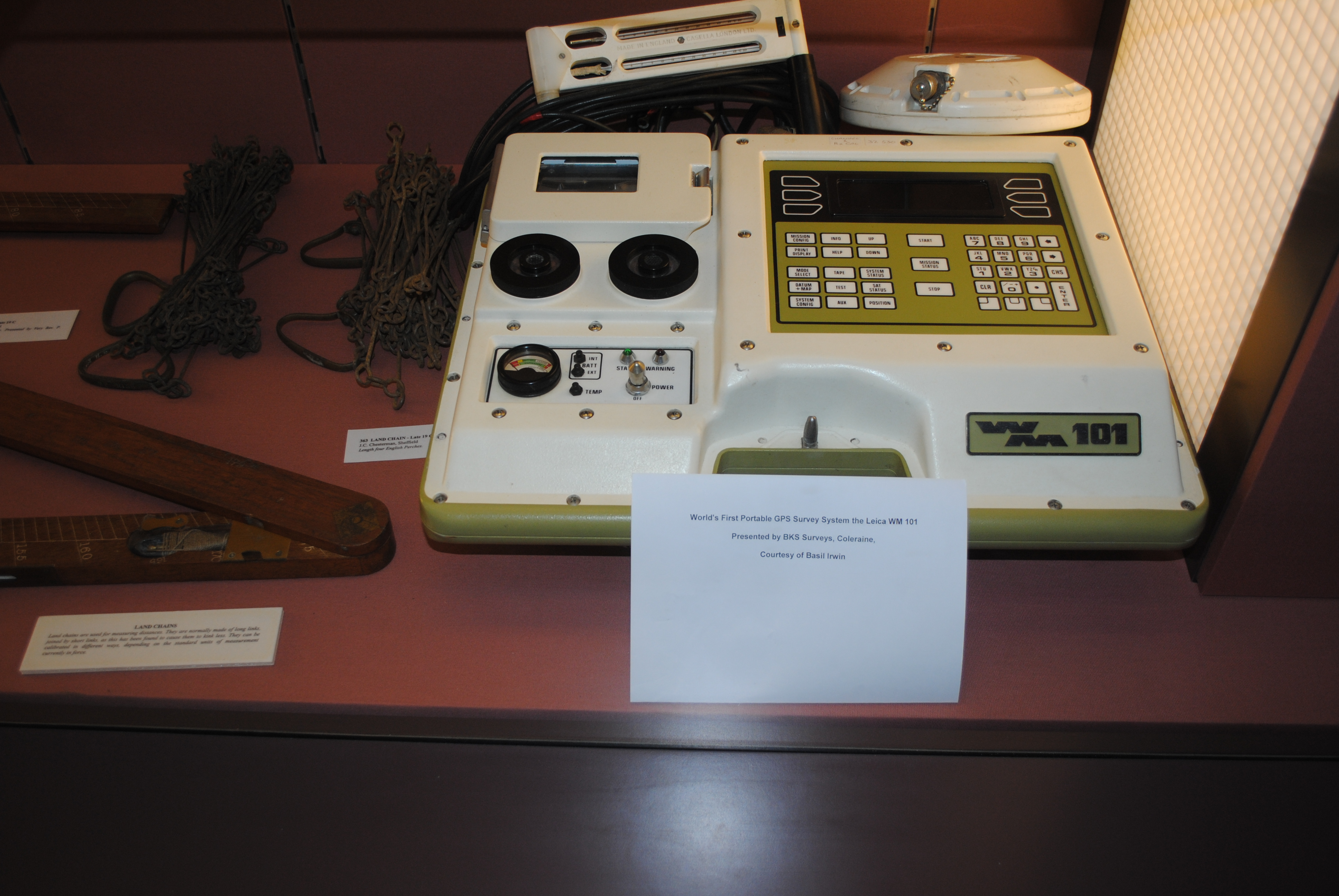
Leica WM 101, the first portable GPS device

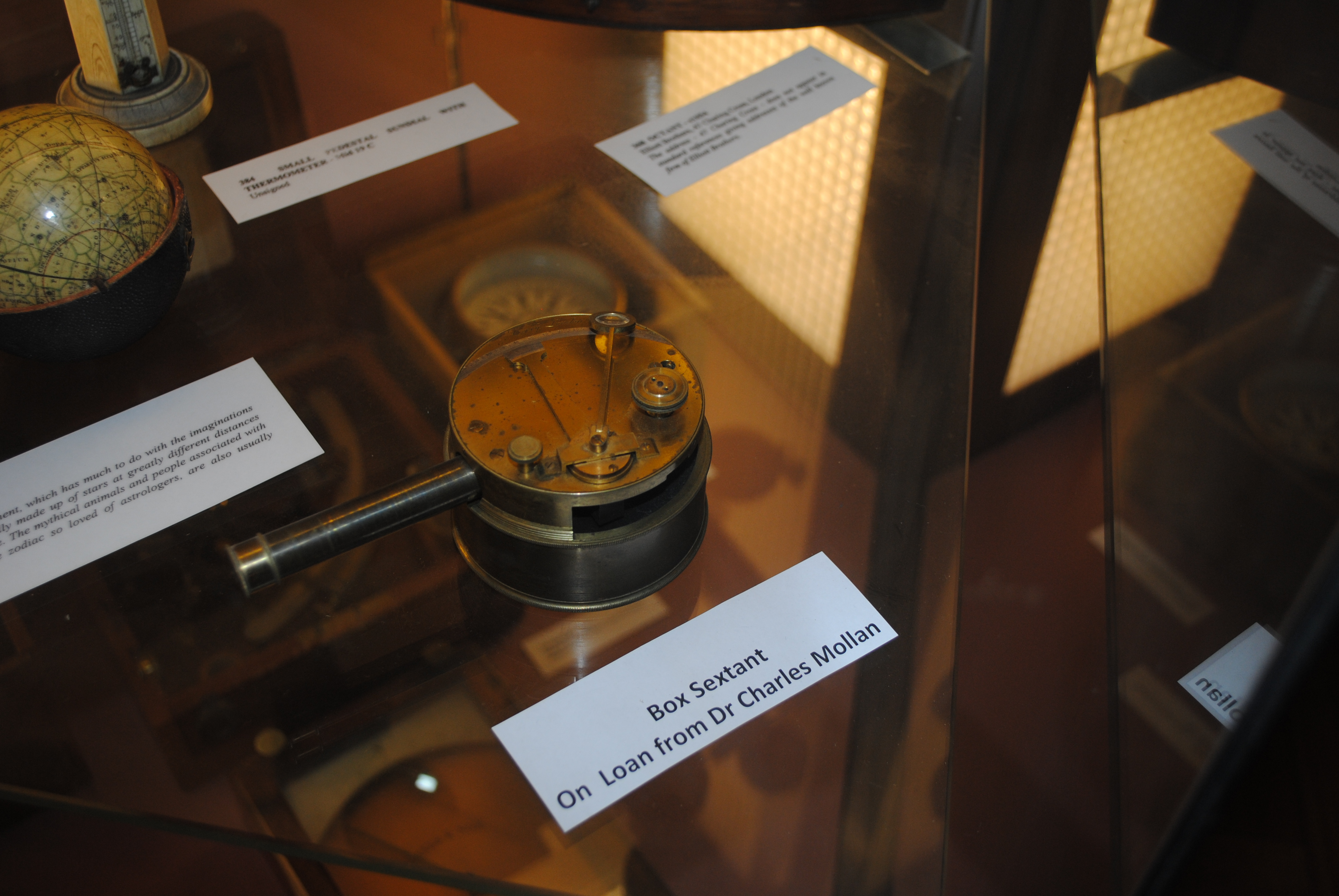
Box sextant

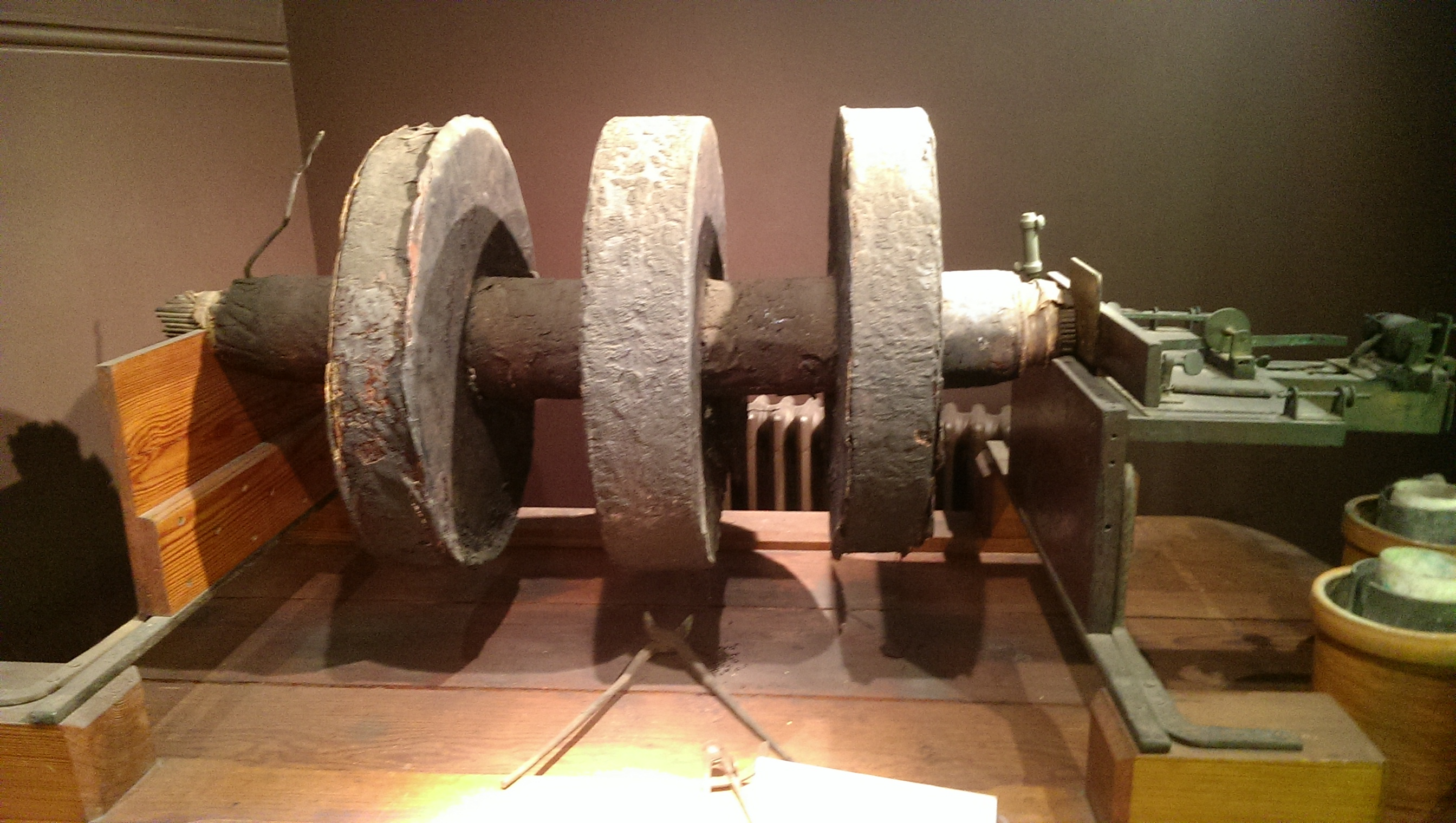
Callan's induction coil (1845)

== Access ==
From June to September 2025, the museum is open on Thursday, Friday and Saturday from 12:00 to 14:00 and 15:00 to 17:00. Tours by request to the curator are also available.
