= Dibyesh Anand =

Indian political scientist and author

- Born: India
- Occupations: Political scientist, author, professor
- Employer(s): University of Westminster, London
- Known for: Research on Tibet, China, Hindu nationalism, and identity politics
- Website: https://www.westminster.ac.uk/about-us/our-people/directory/anand-dibyesh

Dibyesh Anand (born 1976) is an Indian political scientist and author. He is currently interim Vice Chancellor at the University of Westminster in London. Anand is known for his research on Tibet, China, postcolonial politics, and the rise of Hindu nationalism in India.

== Early life and education ==
Anand was born in India and pursued his higher education in political science. He received his doctoral degree (PhD) from the University of Westminster in London.

== Academic career ==
Anand is a professor of International Relations and has served as Head of the Department of Politics and International Relations. He is recognised for his interdisciplinary research approach and critical perspectives on power, identity, and nationhood.

He has delivered lectures globally and written for academic journals and mainstream media. His work spans across South Asia, Tibet, and China, focusing on state violence, marginal identities, and nationalism.

== Publications ==
- Anand, Dibyesh (2007). Geopolitical Exotica: Tibet in Western Imagination. University of Minnesota Press. ISBN 9780816647668.
- Anand, Dibyesh (2009). Tibet: A Victim of Geopolitics. Routledge. ISBN 9780415484497.
- Anand, Dibyesh (2011). Hindu Nationalism in India and the Politics of Fear. Palgrave Macmillan. ISBN 9781349371907.

== Personal life ==
Anand is openly gay and has been a vocal advocate for LGBTQ+ rights particularly in South Asian contexts.

== See also ==
- Hindu nationalism
- China–India relations
- Postcolonialism
