= John G. Hughes =

John G. Hughes FCBS FLSW (born 28 August 1953) is a former president of the National University of Ireland, Maynooth and Pro-Vice-Chancellor of the National University of Ireland who served from 2004 to 2010 and Vice-Chancellor at Bangor University, Wales, from 2010 to 2018.

== Early life and career ==
Professor Hughes was born and raised in Belfast, educated at St. Mary's Christian Brothers' Grammar School and at Queen's University Belfast where he obtained a BSc with First Class Honours in Mathematics and a PhD in Theoretical Physics.

Following appointments at Queen's and at the International Atomic Energy Agency in Vienna, he became Professor of Information Systems Engineering at the University of Ulster in 1991. There he held a range of senior academic positions and was actively involved in promoting research and technology transfer initiatives which attracted substantial funding to the university. He sits on the boards of a range of public and private sector organisations. Under his presidency at Maynooth, the institution suffered severe financial problems.

Hughes has international links in Europe, the US and Asia. He has initiated a large number of research collaborations with prestigious institutions including the Max-Planck Institutes, Carnegie Mellon University, MIT and Tsinghua University in Beijing.

In 2013, Hughes was elected a Fellow of the Learned Society of Wales.

=== Criticism ===
Hughes was criticised for appointing his then wife to a high-paying position at Bangor, and the purchase and refurbishment of his house by the university (costing the institution £750,000) as well as for a number of other scandals and for being a non-Welsh speaker. Under Hughes's leadership, Bangor University faced severe financial problems, resulting in several reductions of staff. From his takeover in 2010, when Bangor University made a £4.2 million profit, to 2017, the university's nominal income had risen by 12 per cent, but their expenditures by 19 per cent with the university's interests and finance costs soaring by 747 per cent. In 2017/18, the university had to spend £10m in interest payments on its debts. From 2013/14 to 2017/18, Bangor University cut staff numbers from 1777.7 to 1608 FTE (minus 9.5 per cent). During the same period, student numbers grew from 10.646 to 11.156 (plus 4.8 per cent), increasing income from student fees. In early 2019, an accountant who studied the university's finances on behalf of trade union criticised that the figures suggested spending had been diverted from staff costs to financing building projects. When a new financial crisis as well as allegations of racist and sexist harassment against his ex-wife were revealed in late 2018, Bangor University announced Hughes's resignation by December 2018, eight months ahead of his ordinary retirement.

Academic offices
Preceded by W. J. Smyth	President of the National University of Ireland, Maynooth; 2004–2010	Succeeded by Philip Nolan
Preceded by Merfyn Jones	Vice-Chancellor of Bangor University; 2010–present	Succeeded by Incumbent
