= Andrew Deeks =

Australian academic and engineer

Andrew J. Deeks
- Born: 1963 (age 62–63); England
- Education: University of Western Australia
- Occupations: Research; Author; Academic; Engineering; Administrator
- Title: Vice Chancellor and President of Murdoch University
- Term: 28 March 2022
- Predecessor: Eeva Leinonen

Andrew Deeks (born 1963) is an Australian academic administrator who became the ninth President of University College Dublin (UCD) in 2014. He is the first Australian and second non-Irish person to hold the presidency after co-founder John Henry Newman. Deeks was previously Pro-Vice Chancellor of Durham University before succeeding Hugh Brady as President of UCD. He became Vice-Chancellor of Murdoch University in April 2022.

== Background ==
Born in England in 1963, his family migrated to Perth, Western Australia, when he was six years old. Deeks holds a bachelor's degree in civil engineering from the University of Western Australia (UWA). In 1984, after he completed his master's, he worked in industry, later returning to the University of Western Australia for a PhD degree. His research works focus on structural dynamics, mechanics and dynamic soil-structure interaction, with more than 150 published papers to his name. He became a Winthrop Professor in civil and resources engineering in 2004. From 2004 to 2009, he was head of school at UWA, before joining Durham University as Pro-Vice-Chancellor in science, being among the Institute of Advanced Research Computing in the university. Deeks became President of University College Dublin in January 2014, and left the position in April 2022.

Membership positions

- Executive Committee of the Universitas – A 21-university network
- Administrative Board of the International Association of Universities
- European Universities Association and the Irish Universities Association
- Fellow of the Irish Academy of Engineering
- Institution of Engineers of Ireland and the Institution of Engineers Australia

Academic offices
| Preceded by Hugh Brady | President of University College Dublin; 2014–2022 | Succeeded by Mark Rogers (acting) |
| Preceded by Eeva Leinonen | Vice-Chancellor of Murdoch University; 2022– | Incumbent |
