= Maynooth University =

University in Ireland, part of the National University of Ireland

- Ollscoil na hÉireann Mhá Nuad
- Other name: Maynooth University/ Ollscoil Mhá Nuad
- Former names: NUI Maynooth (1997–2014); St Patrick's College, Maynooth (1795-1997)
- Motto: Veritati Fir Fer
- Motto in English: Truth Strength Courage
- Type: Public
- Established: 1997 – Constituent University of National University of Ireland; 1795 – St Patrick's College, Maynooth
- Parent institution: National University of Ireland
- Academic affiliations: EUA; NUI; IUA; UI
- Chancellor: Maurice Manning (as Chancellor of the National University of Ireland)
- President: Eeva Leinonen
- Vice-president: Aidan Mulkeen
- Academic staff: 821
- Administrative staff: 570
- Students: 16,000
- Undergraduates: 13,700
- Postgraduates: 2,465
- Doctoral students: 165
- Other students: 1,100
- Location: Maynooth; County Kildare, Ireland; 53.3835°N 6.5996°W
Colours
- Website: www.maynoothuniversity.ie

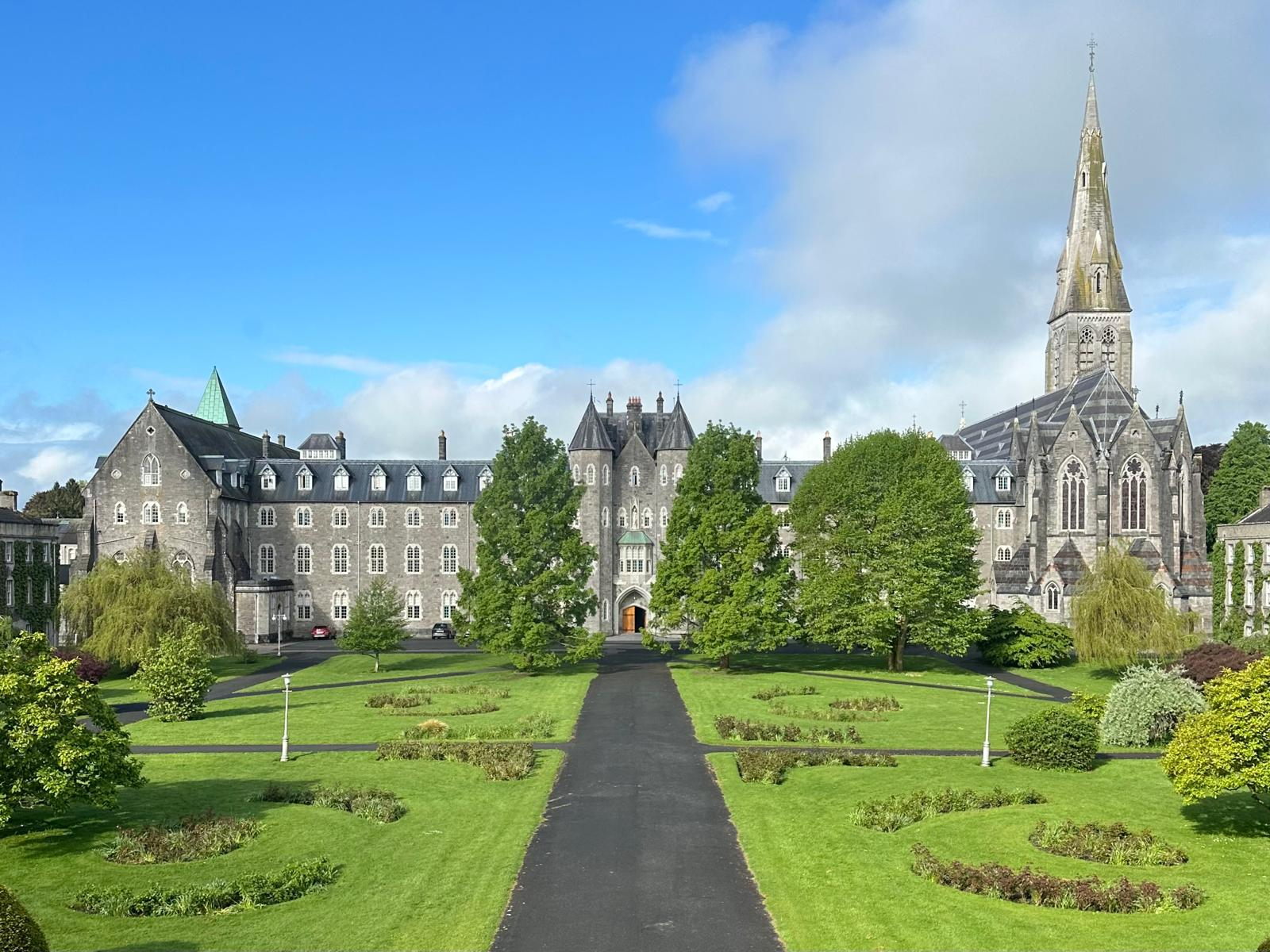
St. Joseph's Square, Maynooth

Maynooth University (MU; Irish: Ollscoil Mhá Nuad) is a constituent university of the National University of Ireland in Maynooth, County Kildare, Ireland. Maynooth University was formerly known as National University of Ireland, Maynooth (NUIM; Irish: Ollscoil na hÉireann Mhá Nuad). It was Ireland's youngest university until Technological University Dublin was established in 2019, having been founded by the Universities Act, 1997, from the secular faculties of the now separate St Patrick's College, Maynooth, which was founded in 1795. Maynooth is one of two university towns in Ireland, the other being Tralee, Co. Kerry.

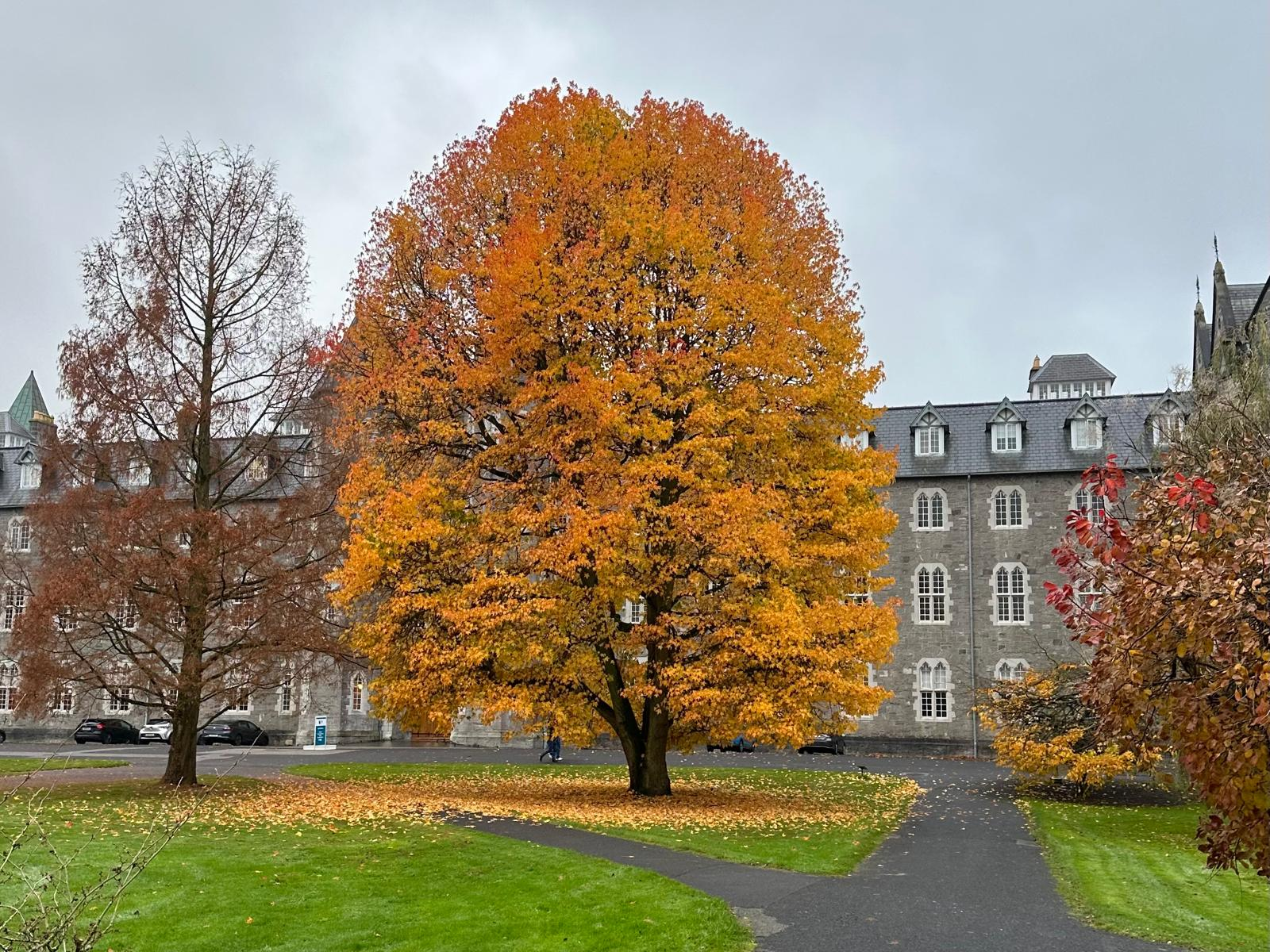
South Campus, Maynooth

The university consists of two connected campuses: an older southern campus, with 19th-century buildings, shared with St Patrick's College, and a modern northern campus, occupying c. 40 hectares (100 acres).

Over 16,000 students are enrolled in the university, employing over 1,000 staff from over 20 different countries. In 2009, Maynooth University was listed as a Top500 university in the Times Higher Education-QS World University Rankings. In 2008, it was named The Sunday Times 'University of the Year'.

In the Times Higher Education Young University Rankings 2023, Maynooth University was ranked as the highest placed of Ireland's four universities under 50 years old.

== History ==
=== 18th and 19th centuries ===
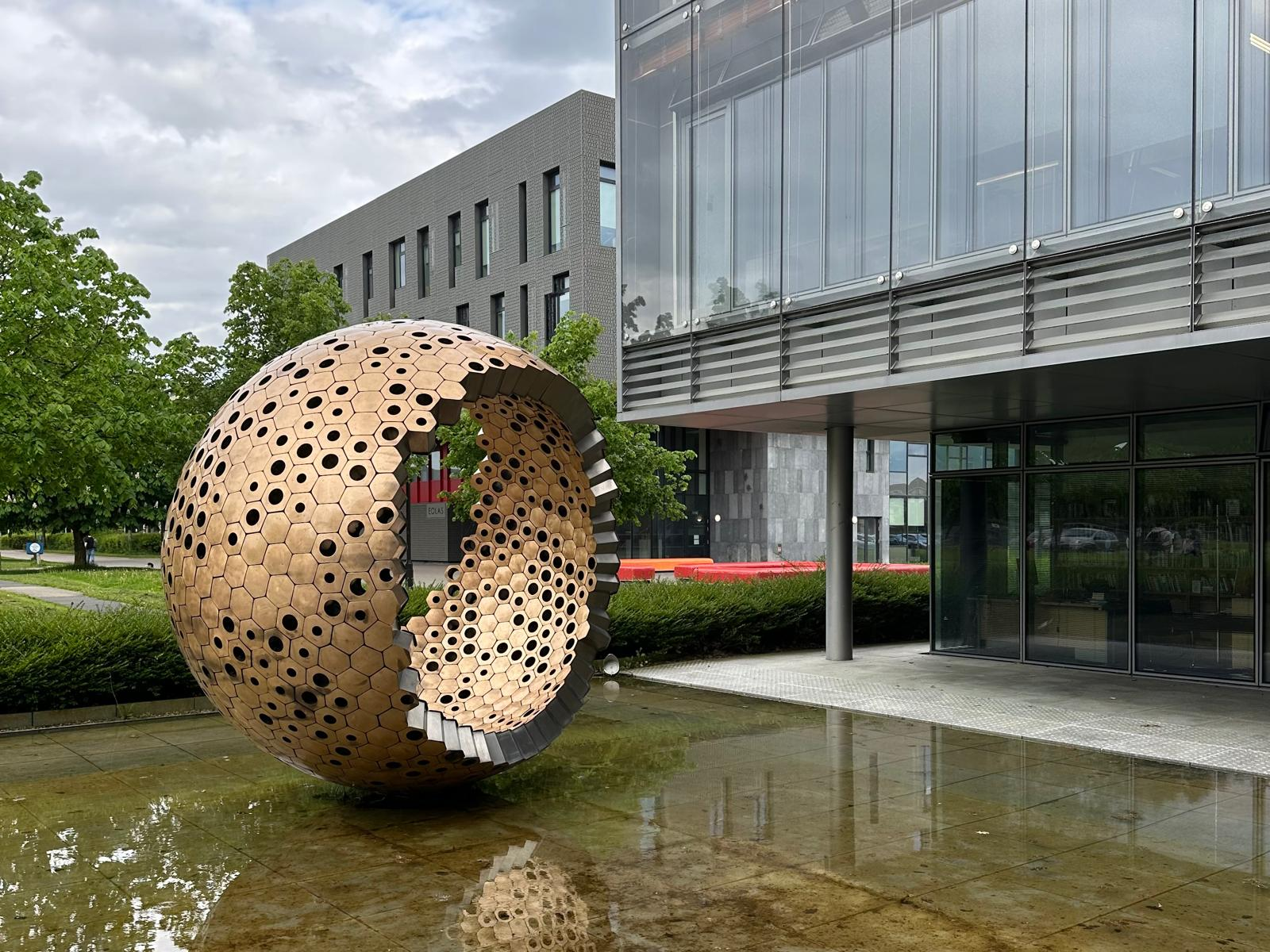
Sculpture "Waggle Dance" by Rachel Joynt and Remco de Fouw

The university and St Patrick's College, Maynooth have a common history from 1795 to 1997. The college in Maynooth was established by the government as a college for Catholic lay and ecclesiastical students in 1795. The lay college was based from 1802 in Riverstown House on the south campus. With the opening of Clongowes Wood College, the lay college which had lay trustees was closed in 1817 and it functioned solely as a Catholic seminary for almost 150 years. In 1876 the college became a constituent college of the Catholic University of Ireland, and later offered Royal University of Ireland degrees in arts and science. The Pontifical Charter was granted to the college in 1896.

=== 20th and 21st centuries ===
The college became a recognised constituent college of the National University of Ireland in 1910. From this time, arts and science degrees were awarded by the National University of Ireland, while the Pontifical University of Maynooth continued to confer its own theology degrees, as these had been prohibited in the Royal University of Ireland, and continued to the National University of Ireland (its successor) until 1997.

In 1966 the college again allowed the entry of lay students; this greatly expanded the college and essentially set the foundation stone for Maynooth University. In 1997 the Universities Act resulted in the transfer of the faculties of arts, Celtic studies, philosophy and science of the recognised college of St Patrick's College to the new university. The university has also expanded into finance and engineering since its creation in 1997. In 2007 the university added business studies, followed by law in 2008.

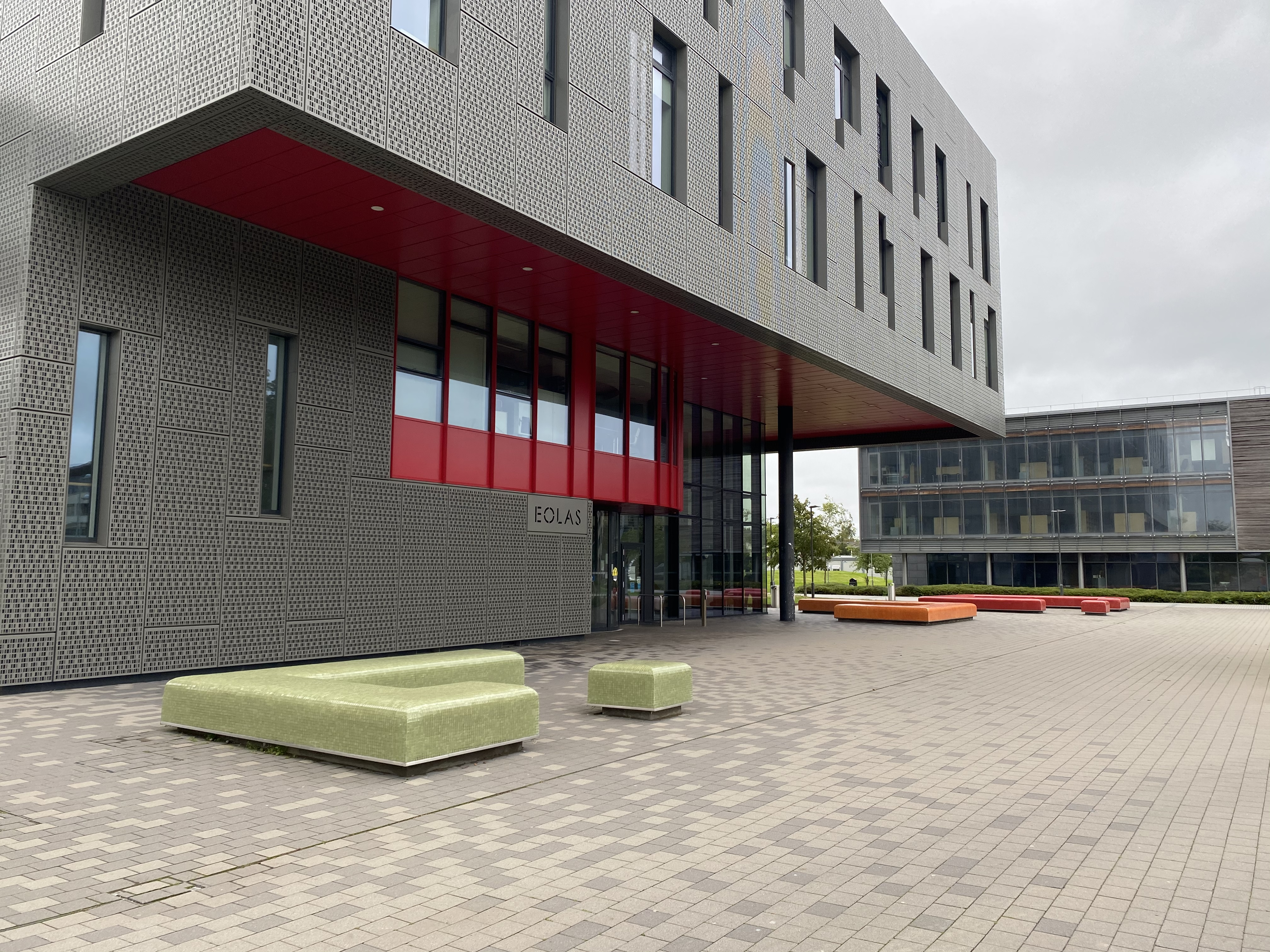
Eolas Building on the North Campus

Any person who was a student at St Patrick's College, Maynooth, and was conferred with a National University of Ireland degree prior to the creation of the university, is legally considered a graduate of Maynooth University.

In 1994, W. J. Smyth was appointed to the position of Master of St. Patrick's College Maynooth (NUI) and in 1997 he became president of MU. In 2004 W. J. Smyth was succeeded by John G. Hughes as president of Maynooth University. Thomas Collins was appointed interim president for 2010–2011, and Philip Nolan served in the role 2011–2021. On 1 October 2021, Finnish academic Eeva Leinonen became the first woman president of the institution.

=== Timeline ===
- 1518 – Garret Óg Fitzgerald, Earl of Kildare, founded the College of St Mary in Maynooth
- 1535 – College of St Mary confiscated as part of Henry VIII's religious reforms
- 1795 – The Royal College of St Patrick established on 5 June 1795 (35 Geo III, cap. 21)
- 1798 – United Irishmen Rebellion; out of 69 students, 18 were expelled for taking the Oath of the United Irishmen
- 1800 – Act of Union 1800; transfer of Maynooth grant from Dublin to London; John Butler, 12th Baron Dunboyne died
- 1800 – First ordinations from Maynooth
- 1801 – First lay college suppressed
- 1802 – A lay college opens in Riverstown Lodge
- 1808 – Dunboyne Establishment case settled between Maynooth Trustees and Butler family
- 1817 – Lay college closed
- 1845 – Maynooth grant increased
- 1871 – Irish Church Act 1869 disestablishes the Church of Ireland, ancillary to which, Maynooth was disendowed and lay trustees left the board
- 1876 – Maynooth becomes a constituent college of the Catholic University of Ireland
- 1880 – Royal University of Ireland founded
- 1895 – Centennial celebrations
- 1896 – Maynooth granted Pontifical University status by Papal Charter
- 1903 – King Edward VII and Queen Alexandra visited it on 24 July 1903
- 1908 – National University of Ireland founded
- 1909 – Royal University of Ireland dissolved
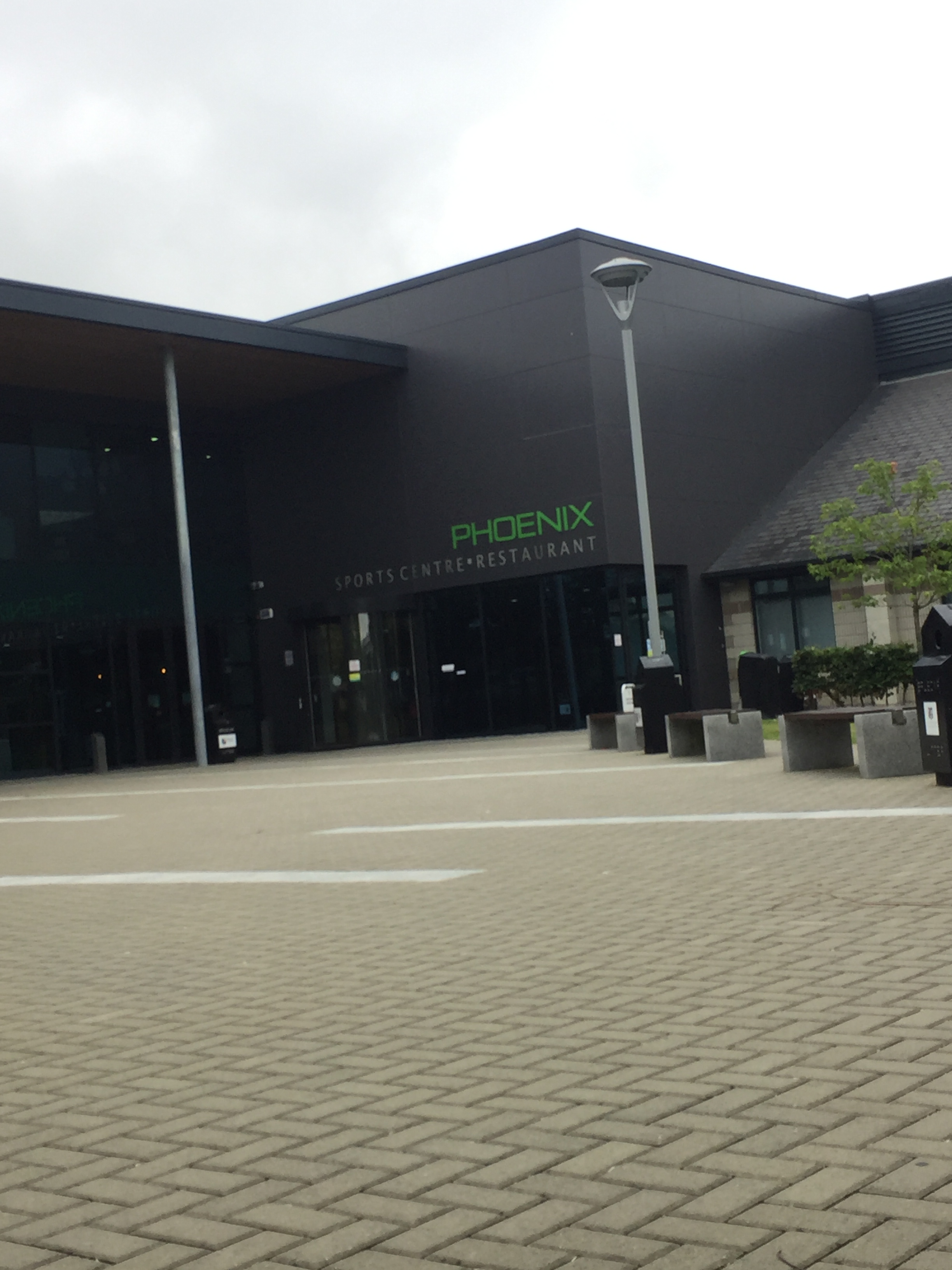
- Phoenix sports centre
  1910 – St. Patricks College, Maynooth officially becomes a recognised college of the National University of Ireland
- 1937 – Department of Sociology founded
- 1966 – Lay students admitted
- 1970 – Dept. of Biology founded as part of the Faculty of Science
- 1979 – Pope John Paul II visits Maynooth
- 1984 – The John Paul II Library is built
- 1987 – Dept. of Computer Science founded as part of the Faculty of Science
- 1995 – Bi-centennial celebrations
- 1996 – Third level fees abolished by the Irish Government
- 1997 – National University of Ireland, Maynooth founded from the faculties of Science, Arts and Celtic studies of Maynooth College of the NUI; Outreach Campus at St. Kieran's College in Kilkenny founded
- 1999 – Foundation of Dept. of Psychology
- 2001 – Foundation of Dept. of Engineering. MA in Leadership course commences for officers in the Irish Defence Forces; joint delivery of programmes with the Defence Forces, in Leadership, Management, Engineering and Computing, up to and including Masters level
- 2004 – Foundation of the Dept. of Media Studies by Professor Christopher Morash, as part of the School of English, Media and Theatre Studies
- 2007 – Marie Curie Laboratory for Membrane Proteins opens, as NUIM wins European Union Marie Curie "Transfer of Knowledge" funding
- 2008 – Named Sunday Times University of the Year; university canteen burns down during open day.
- 2009 – Foundation of Department of Law with Professor Sandeep Gopalan as the first head of department.
- 2010 – Announced that Froebel College of Education will move to the university by 2013; formation of the School of Business; Professor John Hughes resigns presidency to take post at Bangor University.
- 2012 – Extension to The John Paul II Library is completed
- 2014 – Rebranded as Maynooth University
- 2018 – Kilkenny campus closed

== Campus ==
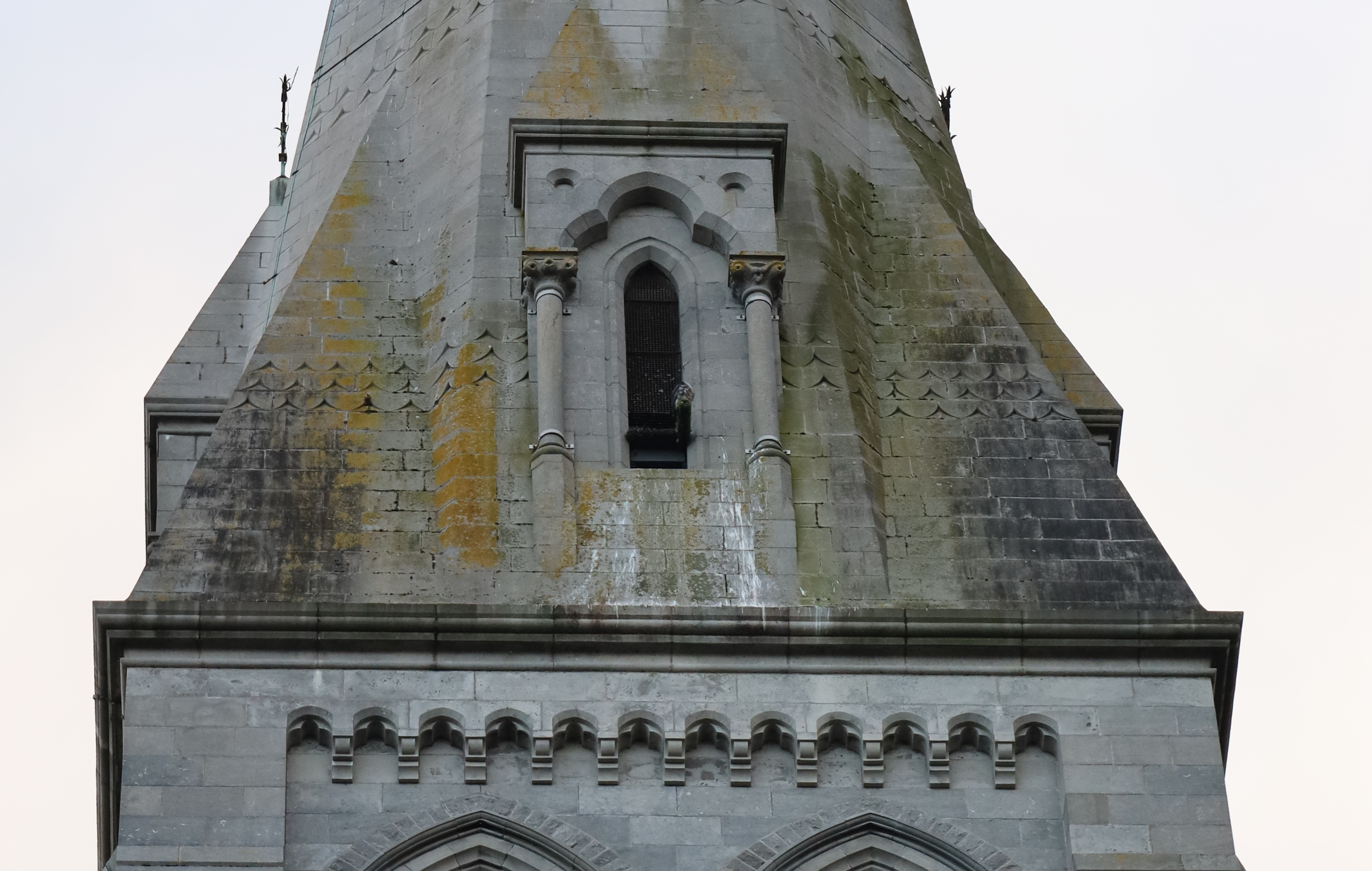
A peregrine falcon perched on the college chapel

The university's main campus straddles the main road from Maynooth to Kilcock. It is divided into the North Campus and the South Campus (also referred to by staff and students as the "new" and "old" campuses respectively). The campuses were connected by means of a footbridge that crossed over the road until mid-2011. The footbridge was then decommissioned due to the construction of a library extension on the South Campus. The campuses are now connected by means of a pedestrian crossing on the Kilcock Road. The campus has four buildings for on-campus accommodation, namely Rye, Village, River, and Courtyard.

=== South Campus ===
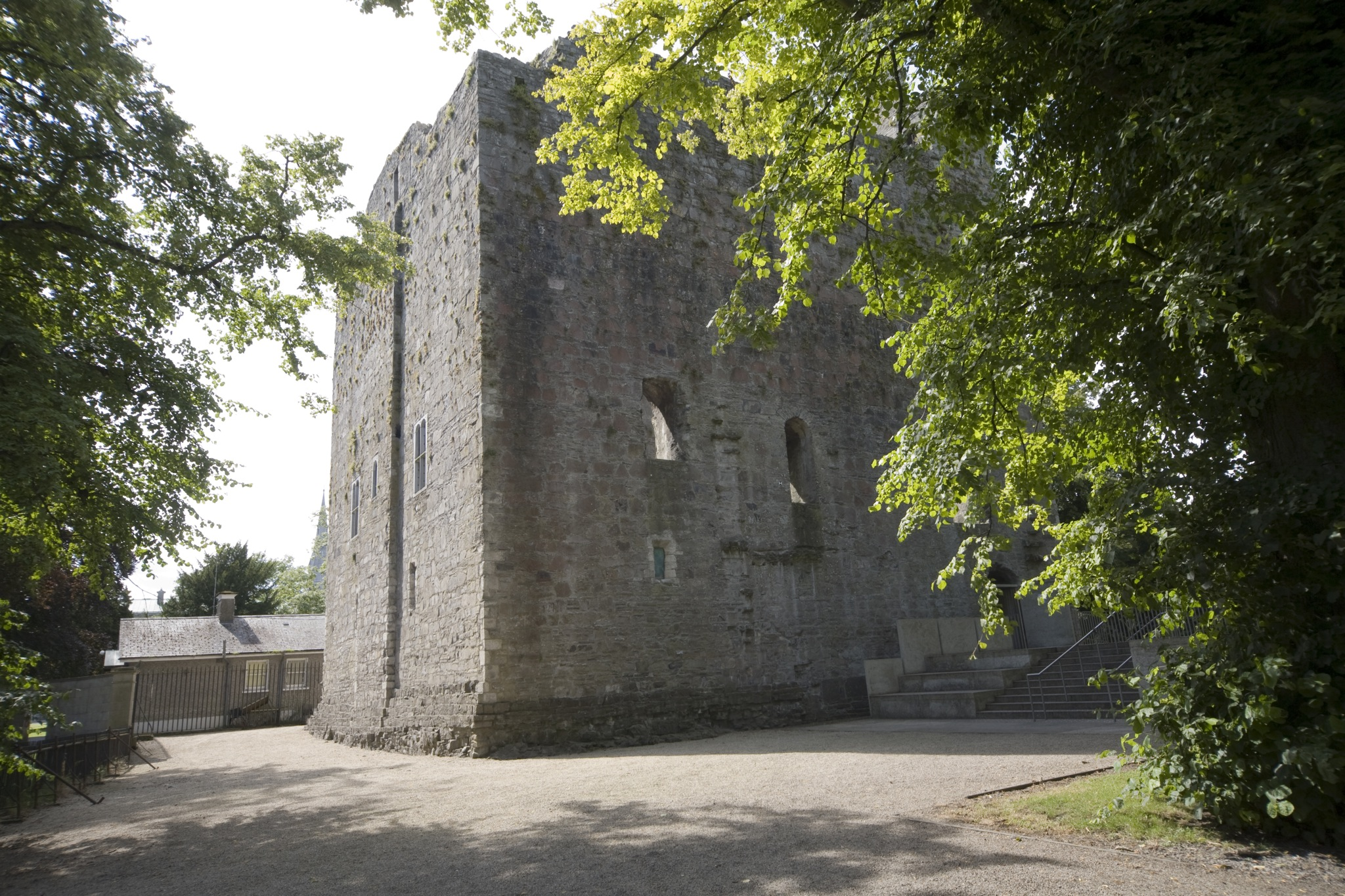
Maynooth Castle at the South Campus gates

The South Campus houses the facilities of St. Patrick's College, as well as most of the administrative offices shared between college and university. A number of MU academic departments also have their offices on the South Campus including Law, Mathematics, Music, Geography, Economics and History. The main buildings, most of which were built in the 19th century, are the Aula Maxima; St. Patrick's House (including the college chapel); the John Paul II Library (built in 1984). In December 2012 an extension to the John Paul II library was completed. The extension is 6,000 m^{2} and accommodates 1,700 students. New, Dunboyne, Humanity and Stoyte Houses which collectively form St. Joseph's Square; Logic House and Rhetoric House. The first building to be completed on the South Campus was named after its designer, John Stoyte. Stoyte House, still a prominent presence on campus, stands in proximity to Maynooth Castle.

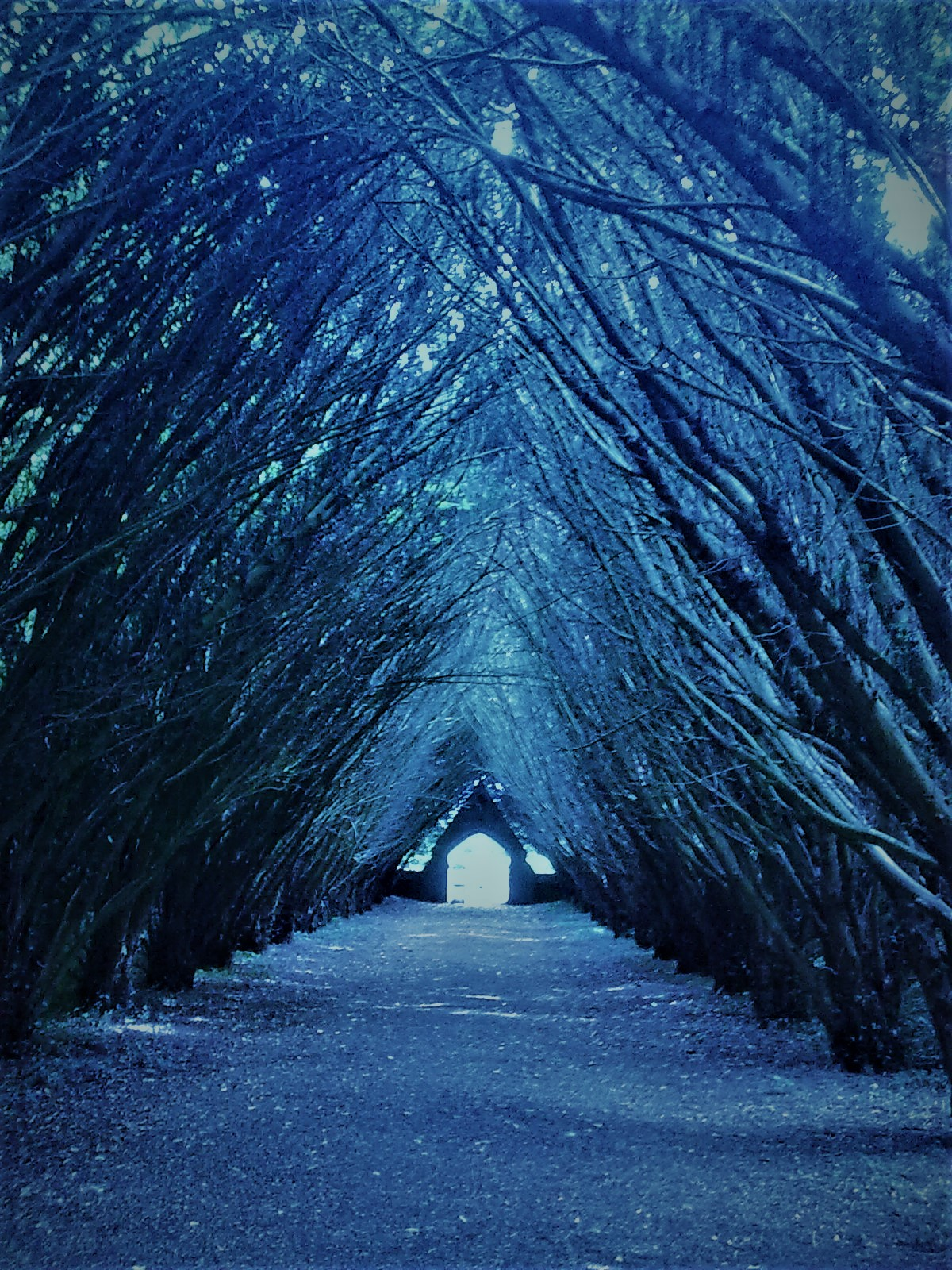
Entrance to the Graveyard on South Campus, showing the trees' convergence like a vault

Over a period of 15 years, the site at Maynooth underwent rapid construction so as to cater for the influx of new students, and the buildings which now border St. Joseph's Square (to the rear of Stoyte House) were completed by 1824. The university chapel is located on the South Campus, just off St. Joseph's Square; masses and choir services are frequently held in the chapel, as is the traditional Christmas carol service. The South Campus also houses the National Science Museum and the Russell Library.

Maynooth University acquired most of south campus from St. Patrick's College in June, 2026. Prior to this acquisition Maynooth University rented facilities on South Campus from St. Patrick's College. The purchase adds twenty eight acres and twenty-four thousand square meters of buildings to Maynooth University.

=== North Campus ===
The North Campus was developed far more recently than the South Campus, in the latter half of the 20th century. Here, the main buildings are the Students' Union building, Sports Complex, Biosciences, and Engineering Building, Callan Science Building (named after the inventor of the induction coil, Nicholas Callan), the Iontas Building, the Arts Building, the Science Building and the John Hume Building. The Eolas Building houses the department of Computer Science, the Business Incubation Centre, the Innovation Value Institute, as well as the Hamilton and Callan Institutes, along with several teaching spaces, while the Technology, Society and Innovation (TSI) Building houses living labs and break out rooms for interactive research; three large theatres of 500, 300 and 250-seat capacity, and research spaces for students, academics and collaboration with industry partners.

The student services function is also based on North Campus, and there are a number of playing fields and a sports complex, which includes a fully equipped gym and an astroturf field. The remainder of MU's academic departments, as well as many research institutes such as the Institute of Microelectronics and Wireless Systems, the Hamilton Institute and the Institute of Immunology, are also located on the North Campus.

=== Kilkenny Campus ===
The university also maintained a campus in Kilkenny from September 1997 until June 2018, based at St Kieran's College, with students enrolled in certificate, diploma and degree programmes.

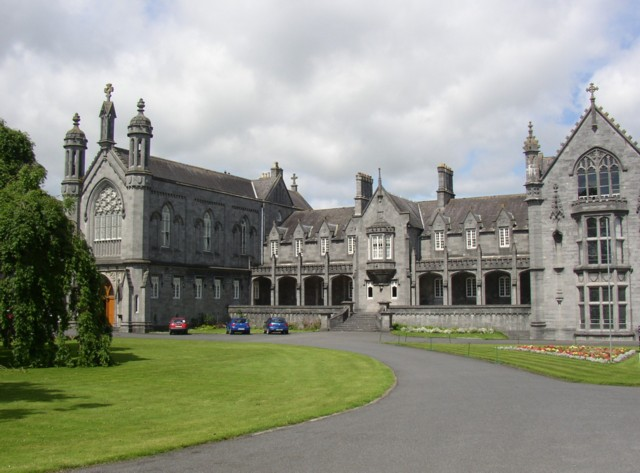
St Kieran's College, Kilkenny

== Administration and organisation ==
The university is divided into three faculties: Arts, Celtic Studies and Philosophy; Science and Engineering; Social Sciences, with most students studying within one of these streams (although some cross-discipline courses are available). The faculties are further divided into various schools and departments.

As of 2016, there were 1,800 students at post graduate level.

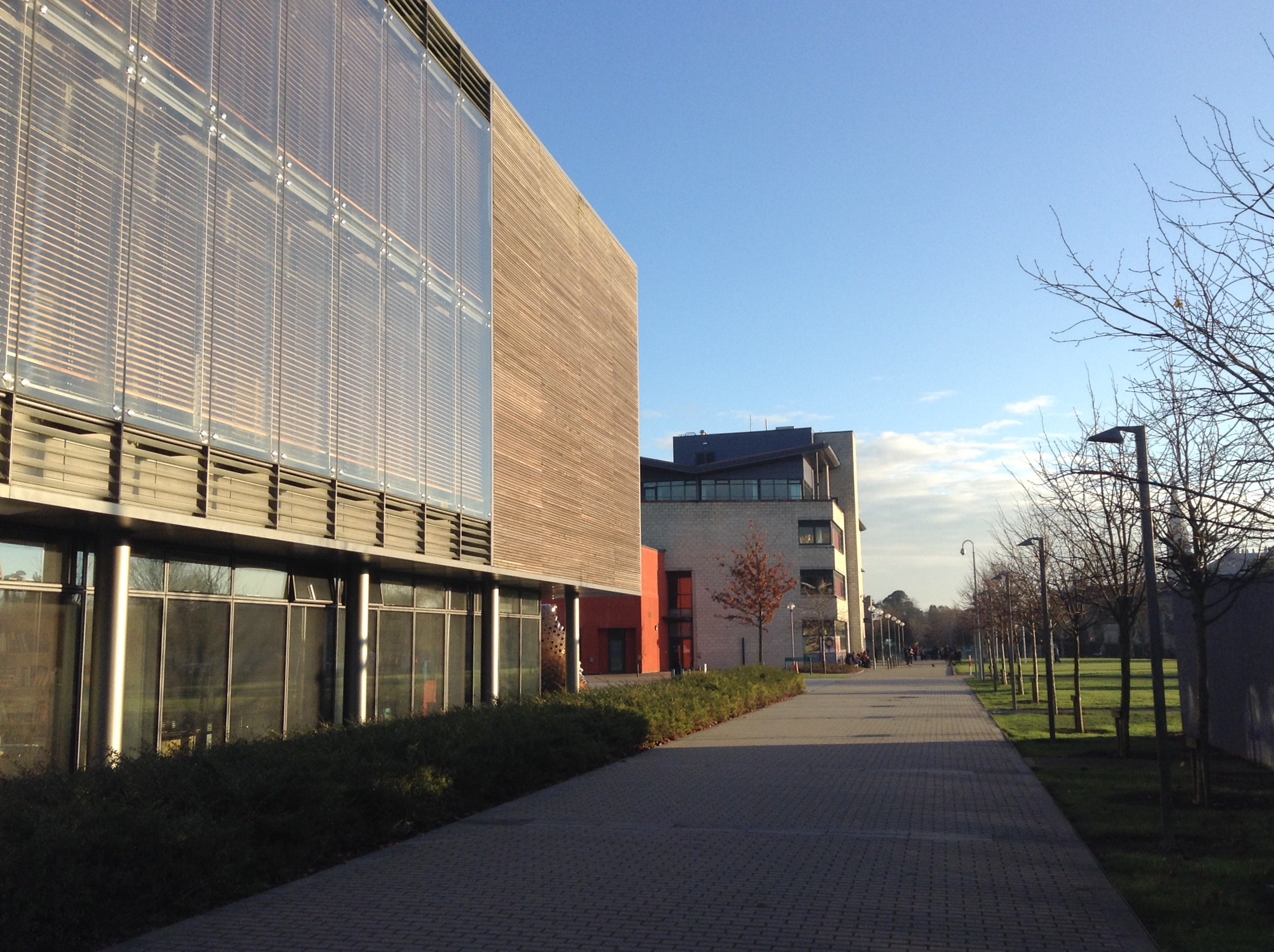
Iontas Building and the John Hume Building in the background

=== Froebel College of Education ===
Since 2013, Froebel College of Education is situated on campus. Maynooth University has established a "Froebel Department of Early Childhood and Primary Education" and awarded Froebel College's four-year Bachelor of Education degrees, Higher Diploma in Primary Education, Master's degree in Special and Inclusive Education and Postgraduate Diploma in Arts in Special Education. The Education Building opened in late September 2016.

As a continuity of Froebel Colleges' heritage Religious Education and Theology modules are delivered by the department and the faculty of Theology of St Patrick's College, Maynooth (SPCM).

=== Academic affiliations ===
Maynooth University is a member of Universities Ireland, The Irish Universities Association, European University Association, European Association for International Education and Eurodoc. MU is also a member of Dublin Region Higher Education Alliance, along with three other universities; TCD, UCD, DCU, and four institutes of technology; DIT, IADT, ITT and ITB. Maynooth University is also a member of the 3U Partnership with Dublin City University and the Royal College of Surgeons Ireland.

The L.L.M. in International Business Law is offered as a dual degree offered in conjunction with the Catholic University of Lyon (UCLy) in France, the course is delivered in English.

The Development Studies programmes of the Kimmage Development Studies Centre, began being delivered from Maynooth and accredited by the university in 2013, with the Centre moving from Kimmage Manor to Maynooth in 2018.

The Diploma in Arts (Church Music) delivered in association with the National Liturgy Institute (St. Patrick's College, Maynooth) and the Dept. of Music NUI Maynooth.

Any student of St Patrick's College, Maynooth prior to the passing of the Universities Act, 1997, upon whom a degree of the National University of Ireland was conferred is now legally considered to be a graduate of Maynooth University. The college continues to share its campus with Maynooth University but remains a separate legal entity with training in canon law, philosophy and theology and awards the degrees of the Pontifical University and is associated with several other colleges.

=== Reputation and rankings ===
In 2008, Maynooth University occupied fourth place on the Irish Sunday Times University League Table 2008, the newspaper's annual league table of Irish third-level institutions, behind TCD, UCD and UCC, having jumped three places since 2007. It was also the top institution for research income won per academic, with one of the best graduate employment records of any Irish university at almost 100 percent. MU was also named "University of The Year 2008" in The Sunday Times University Guide (UK), beating UCD which finished second.

University rankings

Global – Overall
- QS World: 771-780 (2026)

In 2009, Maynooth University was listed as a Top500 university in the Times Higher Education-QS World University Rankings.

In 2010, Maynooth University recorded the highest growth in first preference school-leaver applications in the university sector.

In 2011, Maynooth University became the first and only institution outside of the United States to be included in the Princeton Review of Best Colleges.

In 2023, Maynooth University was ranked as the Number 1 Young University in Ireland by Times Higher Education.

==== Academic competition ====
St Patrick's College (NUI) won the inaugural Irish higher education television quiz show, Challenging Times, in 1991. The quiz, broadcast by RTÉ and based on University Challenge in the UK, was also won by teams from Maynooth in 1992 and 1999.

A robotic soccer team, "Numanoids", jointly representing Maynooth University and the University of Newcastle in Australia, won the soccer Standard Platform League (2-Legged Robot) RoboCup World Championship in July 2008. The 2008 competition, which was held in Suzhou, China and which involved 440 teams from 35 countries, was the first year that a team from Maynooth University entered the event.

Maynooth University first entered the Microsoft Imagine Cup in 2007. It achieved both first and third place in the Imagine Cup Ireland finals, earning participation in the world finals in Seoul, South Korea in August 2007. Team inGEST (Interactive Gesture), who developed a low-cost interactive system for teaching sign language using standard web cameras for feedback, achieved a top-six position in the finals and went on to Silicon Valley in February 2008 as part of the Imagine Cup Innovation Accelerator Program. In 2008, students tied for second place in the Microsoft Imagine Cup in the category of "Embedded Development". A total of 124 teams representing 61 countries and regions took part in 2008. In 2010, the university won the award for Best Windows Azure Application with their cloud-based medical record system.

=== Coat of Arms ===
Maynooth University coat of arms, granted 2016

The coat of arms, which were granted by the Chief Herald of Ireland in 2016, are blazoned: Argent an open book leaved and bound proper clasped or a chief gyrony of six of the field and gules on a point in point of the last a cross pattée fitchy at all points of the first.

The book represents a place of universal learning, the cross the university's links to the seminary, the division of the chief into six representing its six disciplines, and the use of red and white is reminiscent of the FitzGerald dynasty's links to Maynooth. The university does not currently use its coat of arms, preferring to use the logo which was introduced in 2014.

=== Research institutes ===
A number of research institutes fall under the auspices of Maynooth University:

- Irish Climate Analysis and Research Units (ICARUS) – Established in order to improve scientific understanding of climate change and its impacts
- Institute of Immunology
- Hamilton Institute
- National Institute for Regional and Spatial Analysis – Based at Maynooth University, NIRSA is a collaborative project involving Mary Immaculate College, Limerick, Institute of Technology, Sligo and Queen's University, Belfast
- The Callan Institute (formerly Institute of Microelectronics and Wireless Systems) – Provides for research into electronic and software systems and wireless communications.
- National Centre for Geocomputation – Leading international research centre in the field of Geocomputation
- An Foras Feasa – The Institute for Research in Irish Historical and Cultural Traditions
- Innovation Value Institute (IVI) – a joint research institute founded by Maynooth University and Intel which was "awarded to Maynooth University in 2006 over Massachusetts Institute of Technology"
- Maynooth University is involved in research at the CTVR Telecommunications Research Centre, based at Trinity College Dublin.

== Student life and traditions ==
Maynooth Students' Union represents the students of Maynooth University, St. Patrick's College, Maynooth as well as students at its associated campus at St Kieran's College.

=== Sporting scholarships ===
The university offers a number of sport scholarships to aspiring students in Gaelic games, rugby, golf, swimming, Soccer and snooker. Maynooth is the only university in Ireland to offer scholarships in swimming. Rugby scholarships were introduced to Maynooth University in 2006 in which scholarship students are obliged to attend the rugby performance centre and to play with the university teams and Barnhall RFC. The Maynooth University Rugby Performance Centre is open to all Rugby Club members attending MU. The aim of the centre is to enhance students' prospects within the game of rugby and to continue to achieve success with the university teams. As part of the link-up with Barnhall RFC, players from the youth system 16–20s are invited to take part in a summer programme. Currently, there are 4 men's teams playing in Barnhall rugby club as well as the introduction of the women's Rugby scholarship there is now a women's rugby team in Barnhall.

=== Recent accolades ===
Year	Placement	Sport	Competition
2014	1st	Collingwood Cup	Soccer
2008	1st	Intervarsity Swimming Championships	Swimming
1979	2nd	Fitzgibbon Cup	Hurling
1977	2nd	Fitzgibbon Cup	Hurling
1976	1st	Sigerson Cup	Gaelic Football
1976	2nd	Fitzgibbon Cup	Hurling
1975	2nd	Fitzgibbon Cup	Hurling
1974	1st	Fitzgibbon Cup	Hurling
1973	1st	Fitzgibbon Cup	Hurling
1973	2nd	Sigerson Cup	Gaelic Football

=== Demographics ===
Student numbers, 2016/17

13,700	Undergraduate students
1,800	Taught postgraduate and professional students
360	Doctoral students
1,700	International students from 95 countries

56% Female	44% Male
84% Undergraduate	16% Postgraduate
86% Full-time	14% Part-time

Staff numbers, 2016/17

821	Academic and research staff
570	Administrative, professional and technical staff
94%	Academic Staff with a Doctorate qualification

== Traditions ==
In addition to individual clubs' intervarsity competitions, Maynooth University has a standing intervarsity competition with Dublin City University (DCU) each year called the 35s, in which the two colleges compete as a whole. Each club faces their counterpart in DCU, the winning university being whichever takes most points out of the 35 available over all sports.

A Christmas Carol service is held in the college chapel on an annual basis. The service is open to staff and students of the university and St Patrick's College, as well as members of the general public. Because of high demand, tickets are allocated by lottery.

In 1990 the Dept. of Mathematics, at St. Patrick's College, Maynooth, initiated by Professor O'Farrell, commenced an annual walk from Dunsink Observatory, to Broombridge, Cabra, to commemorate the mathematician William Rowan Hamilton. Initially called The Quaternion Walk, now called The Hamilton Walk, takes place in October each year.

The Maynooth Alumni Association is for graduates of Maynooth University and St Patricks College, Maynooth, who wish to keep in touch with their College and also provides the means to stay in touch with friends and classmates. It hosts a number of events such as the Alumni Ball, Networking events, and publishes the Alumni magazine The Bridge.

== Notable alumni and faculty ==
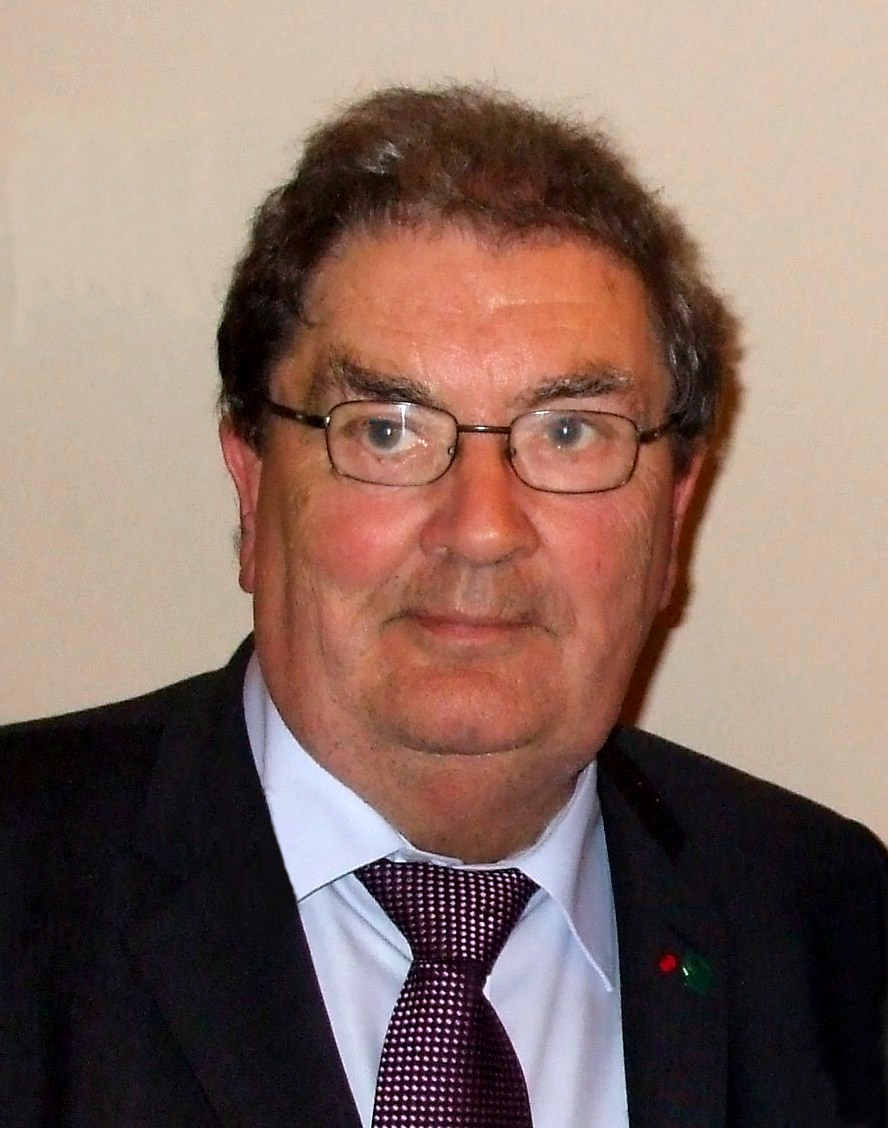
John Hume, Nobel Laureate

=== Nobel laureates and contributors ===
- John Hume, graduate, politician, activist, Nobel laureate and winner of the Sean Mc Bride Peace Award. MP for Foyle and leader of the Social Democratic and Labour Party 1979–2001.

=== Government, politics, law and public policy ===
- Former Taoiseach Bertie Ahern, appointed Honorary Adjunct Professor of Mediation and Conflict Intervention in the School of Business and Law
- Ruth Coppinger HDipEd, Socialist TD (Dublin West) 2014–2020, 2024-present
- Joe Costello, TD (Dublin Central)
- Noel Dempsey, TD and Cabinet Minister
- Éamon de Valera, President of Ireland, lectured in Mathematics and Mathematical Physics at Maynooth in 1912
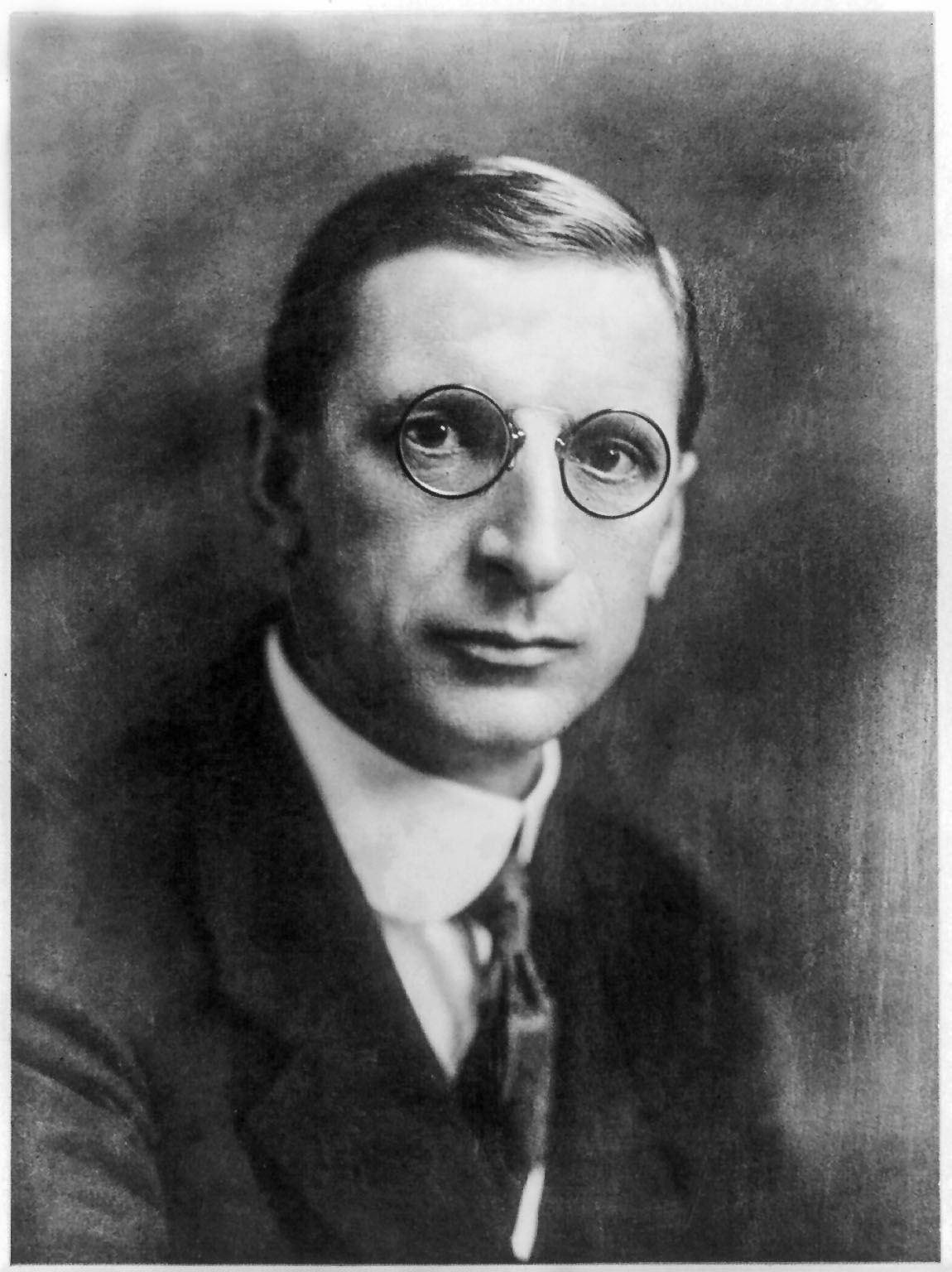
  Éamon de Valera (c 1922), Taoiseach and President of Ireland lectured at Maynooth
- John Blake Dillon the Irish nationalist, Young Ireland member, who co-founded The Nation newspaper and spent two years in Maynooth
- Paddy Gormley Nationalist Member of the Northern Ireland parliament.
- Mary Hanafin TD, Former Minister for Social and Family Affairs (BA, HdipEd)
- Brian Hayes, TD (Dublin South West)
- Joe McHugh, TD (Donegal North East)
- Catherine Martin, Minister for Tourism, Culture, Arts, Gaeltacht, Sport and Media
- John O'Brennan, political scientist
- Maureen O'Brien (Irish Army general), first woman to attain the ranks of Lt Colonel (Army line), Colonel and Brigadier General in the Irish Defence Forces
- Kevin O'Higgins, MP, TD
- Mary O'Rourke, Former TD, Sen. (BA, HdipEd)
- Joe O'Toole(HdipEd), former president of the Irish Congress of Trade Unions (ICTU) and Independent NUI senator
- Richard Lalor Sheil MP, and playwright, an associate of Daniel O'Connell and a founder of the Catholic Association attended the lay college in Maynooth, and strongly spoke in favour of the Maynooth Grant.
- Stephen Woulfe who became a barrister, and Attorney General and the first Catholic to be Chief Barron of the Irish Exchequer also attended the lay college at Maynooth.

=== Arts and the media ===
- Concert promoter Jim Aiken
- Professional footballer Jake Carroll
- Broadcaster Craig Doyle
- Playwright and short story writer Brian Friel, who graduated with a BA in 1948
- Poet Denis Florence MacCarthy
- Playwright Frank McGuinness taught English in Maynooth
- Chris Morash, chair of the Broadcasting Authority of Ireland Compliance Committee was a professor of English, Media and Theatre Studies at NUI Maynooth
- Eurovision 1996 winner Eimear Quinn
- Former Miss Ireland Niamh Redmond is a graduate in finance
- PR Consultant, RTE former Board Chair Tom Savage BD BA.
- Darragh Ennis, professional quizzer and television personality
- Musician Suté Iwar
- Television personality Catherine Agbaje

=== Science, technology and academia ===
- Dermot Barnes-Holmes, Professor of Psychology, is the world's most prolific author in the experimental analysis of behaviour for the years 1980–1999, and is noted for the development of Relational Frame Theory alongside Steven C. Hayes.
- Nicholas Callan, inventor of the induction coil, who was a student and Professor of Natural Philosophy (Physics) at Maynooth
  Nicholas Callan, inventor of the induction coil
- Sir Dominic Corrigan Bart., MD, MP, physician, first Catholic president of the Royal College of Physicians, member of the Queen's Colleges Senate, Vice-Chancellor of the Queen's University in Ireland, and Liberal MP for Dublin City was student of the lay college in the early 19th century.
- Mathematician and Classical scholar Pádraig de Brún was Professor of Mathematics at Maynooth prior to becoming president of UCG (NUI Galway).
- Sir Joseph de Courcy Laffan physician to the Duke of Kent and Duke of York attended the early lay college in Maynooth.
- Christopher Fleming MD, former president of the Royal College of Surgeons
- John Hegarty, former Provost of Trinity College Dublin, holds both a BSc in Physics/Chemistry/Mathematics/Philosophy and a HDipEd from the National University of Ireland, Maynooth.
- Theologian and physicist Gerald Molloy
- Noted astronomer and physicist Susan McKenna-Lawlor, Professor of Experimental Physics.
- Professor Emeritus of Irish at National University of Ireland Galway Breandan O'Madagain
- Katriona O'Sullivan memoirist and director of the national centre for inclusive higher education
- Philosopher and professor at Princeton University, Philip Pettit
- Philosopher and former professor at University of Notre Dame Ernan McMullin
- Desmond Tobin, Professor of Dermatological Science at University College Dublin
- Peter Thorne is a climatologist and professor of physical geography in the Department of Geography and chair of the International Surface Temperature Initiative.
- Niamh Wycherley, medieval historian, assistant professor in early Irish history at Maynooth, between the departments of history and early Irish.

=== Theology ===
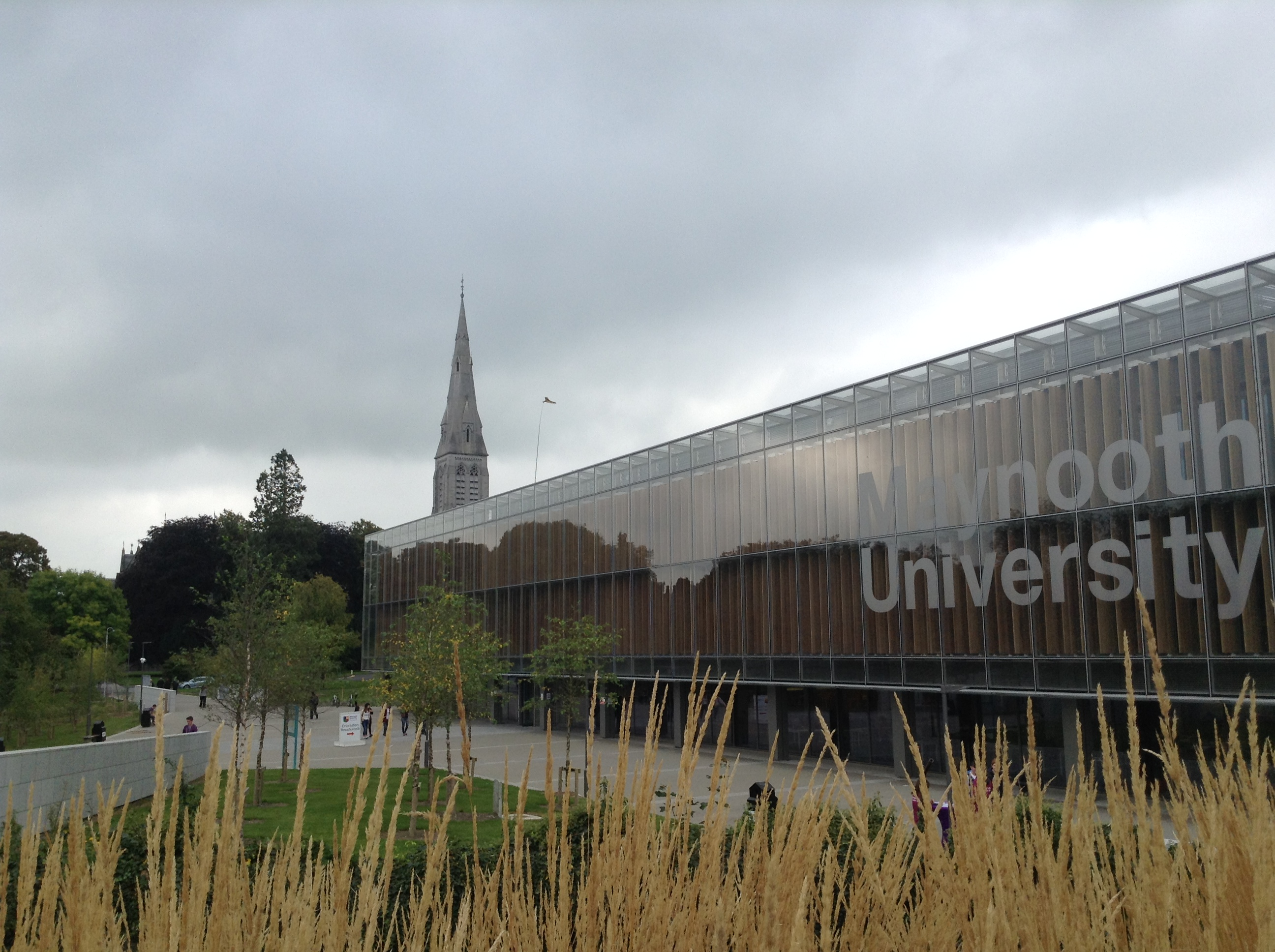
Pope St. John Paul II Library on Maynooth University's South Campus

- Cornelius Denvir, mathematician, natural philosopher, and Bishop
- John Blowick BA BD, theologian founder of the Maynooth Mission to China(Columban Fathers)
- Linda Hogan, theologian and ethicist, professor at the Irish School of Ecumenics, Trinity College Dublin
- Former president of Maynooth, and later Archbishop of Melbourne, Australia, Daniel Mannix
- Gerald Molloy theologian and physicist.
- Msgr. Matthew O'Donnell, University of Louvain Professor of Ethics, 26th president of Maynooth College.
- Joseph S. O'Leary theologian, philosopher, English Literature Buddhist-Christian dialogue.

=== Honorary degree awardees ===
- Golfer Pádraig Harrington
- Aga Khan head of the Ismaeli Muslim community
- Seán Quinn businessman and conglomerateur
- Barry Douglas (pianist) pianist
- Krzysztof Penderecki composer

== Publications ==
=== Currently active ===
- Silver Hand Journal: Online student magazine featuring articles on student and local interest, cultural writing and creative works.
- University News: Quarterly bulletin
- ReSearch: Magazine detailing current research at the university
- The Bridge: Biannual alumni magazine produced by the Alumni Association.
- The Print: Monthly magazine published by the Maynooth Students' Union, featuring editorials, interviews, creative works and campus news
- The Golden Thread: Newsletter featuring editorials, comments and articles on current issues regarding the law department and the area of law in general
- The Irish Law Journal: Peer-reviewed and student-edited law journal
- Archivium Hibernicum: founded in 1911 is an annual historical journal published by St. Patrick's College, Maynooth, and the Dept. of Modern History, Maynooth University.
- Maynooth Philosophical Papers, a biennial journal founded in 2002 by Thomas A. F. Kelly and edited in the Department of Philosophy

=== Defunct ===
- MU Times: Weekly online magazine. mutimes.ie
- The Tonic / Maynooth Advocate: newspaper titles published by the defunct Publications Society.
- The SUS / nuimsu.com / The Spoke: former newspaper & magazine titles published by the Students' Union (predecessors to The Print)

== Gallery ==
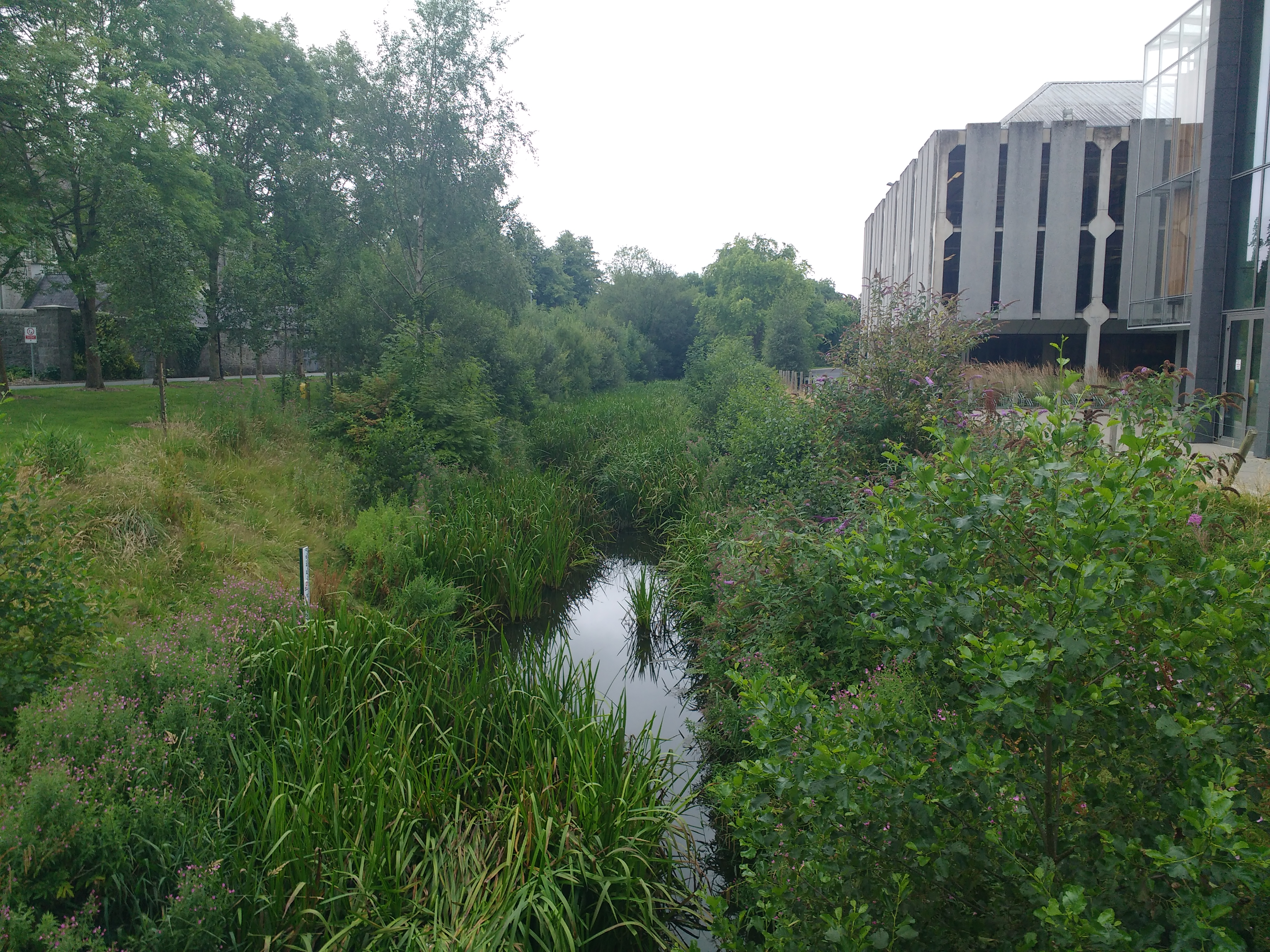
The Rye River flowing by the university library

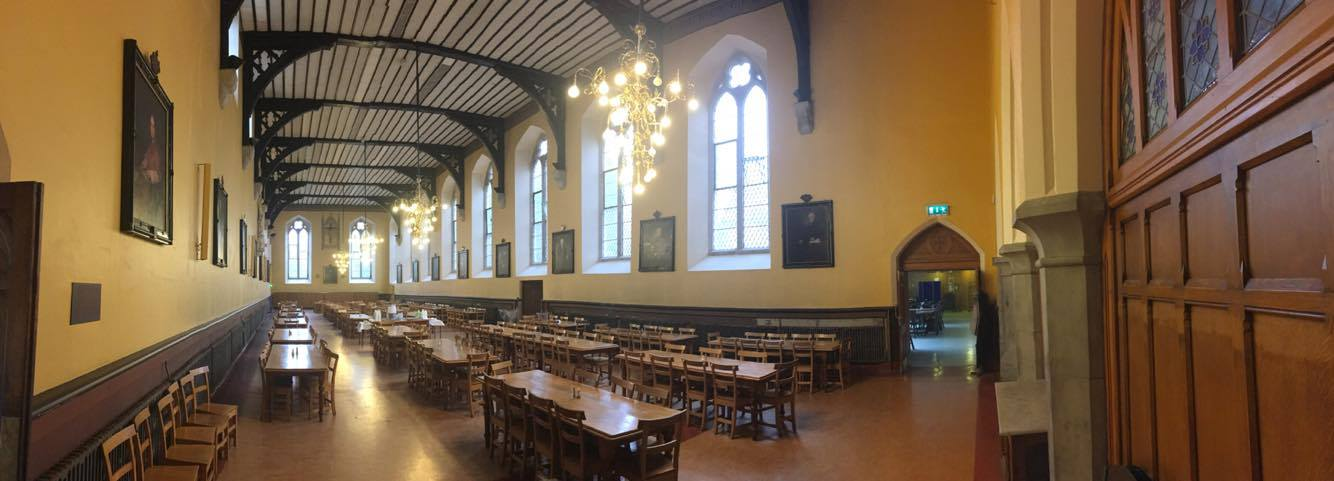
Pugin Hall, Maynooth University.

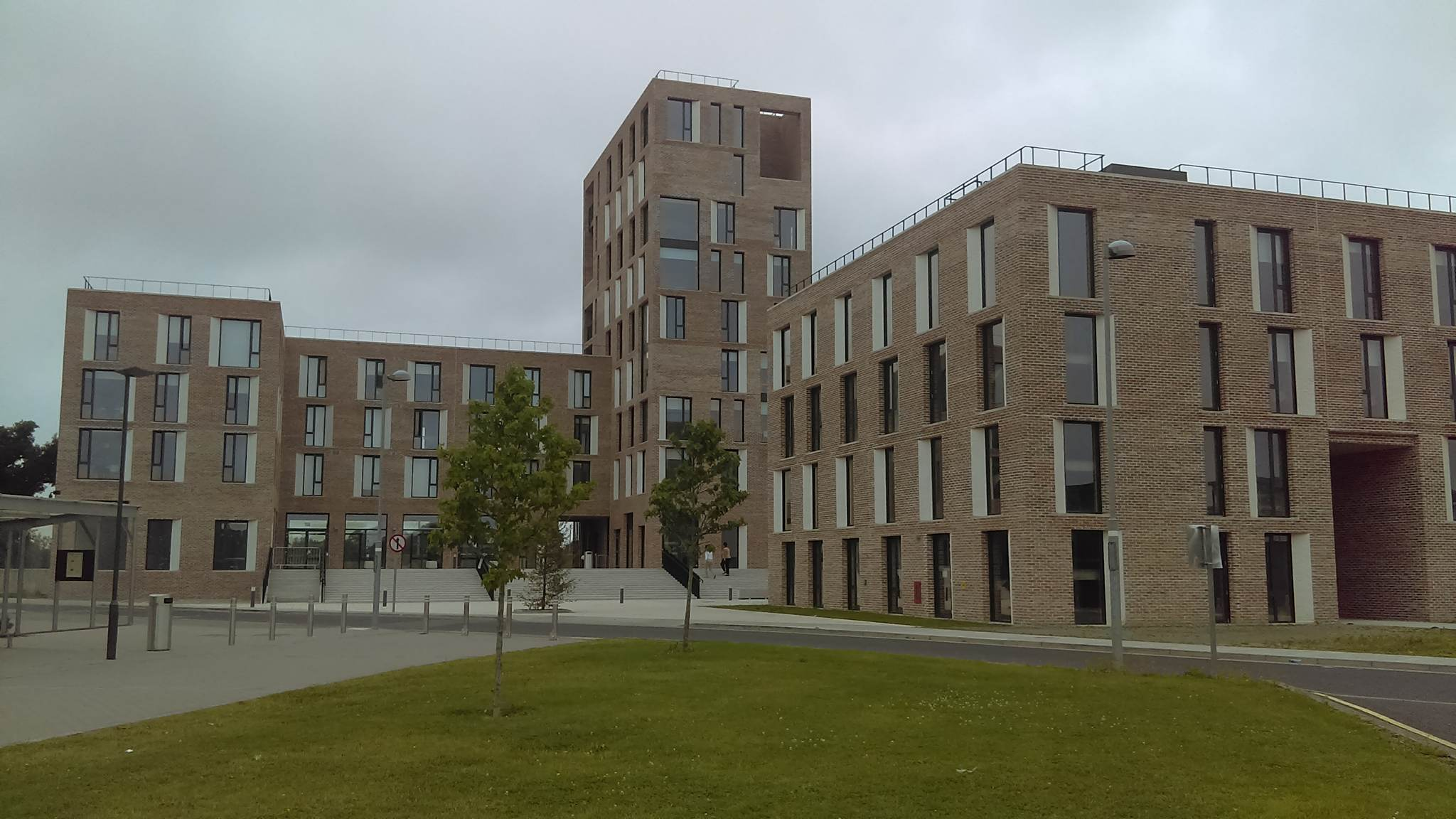
The Courtyard apartments on Maynooth University's North Campus

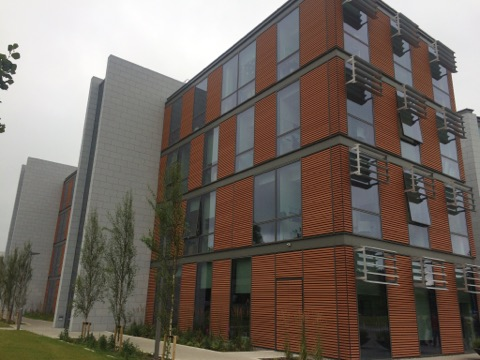
The Maynooth University School of Education, North Campus

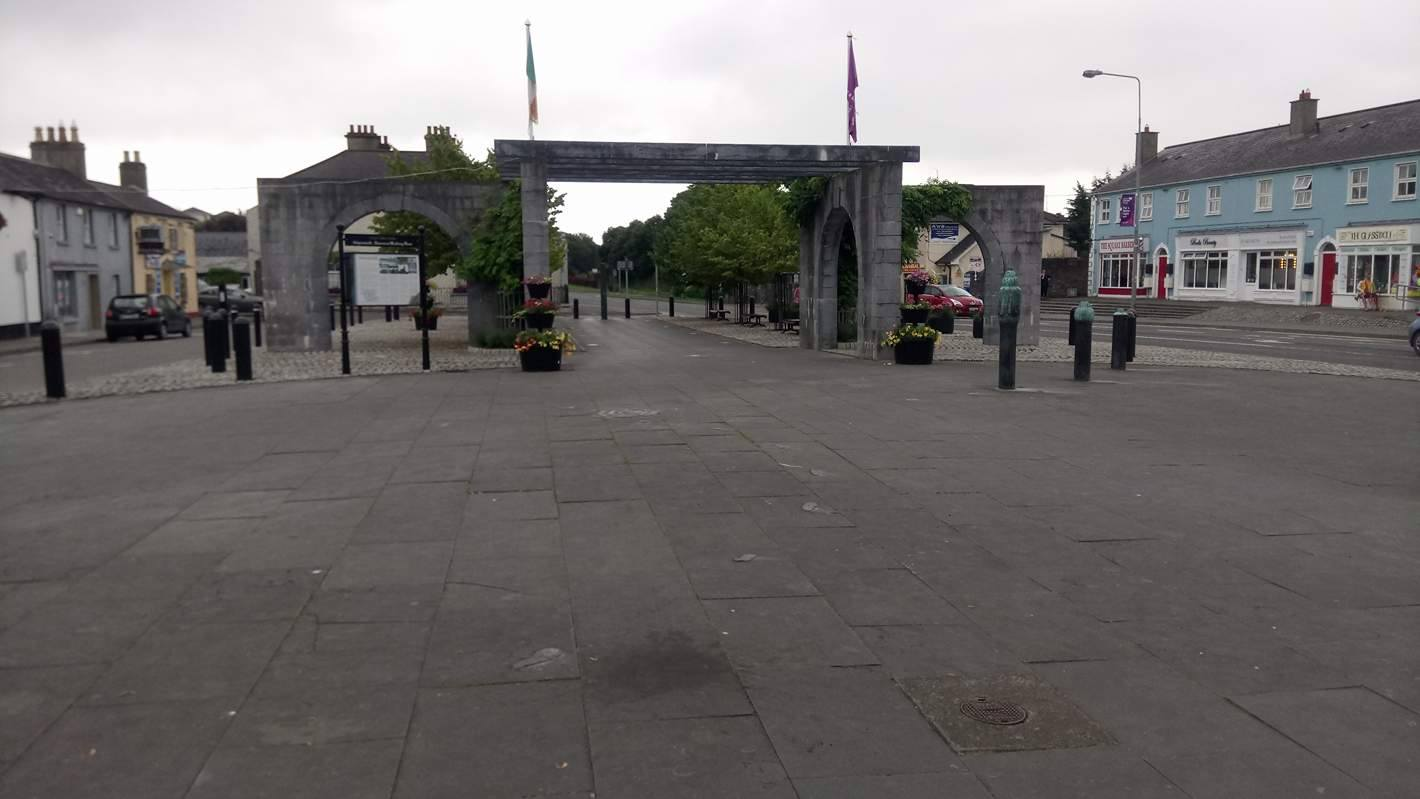
The famine memorial on the main street in Maynooth

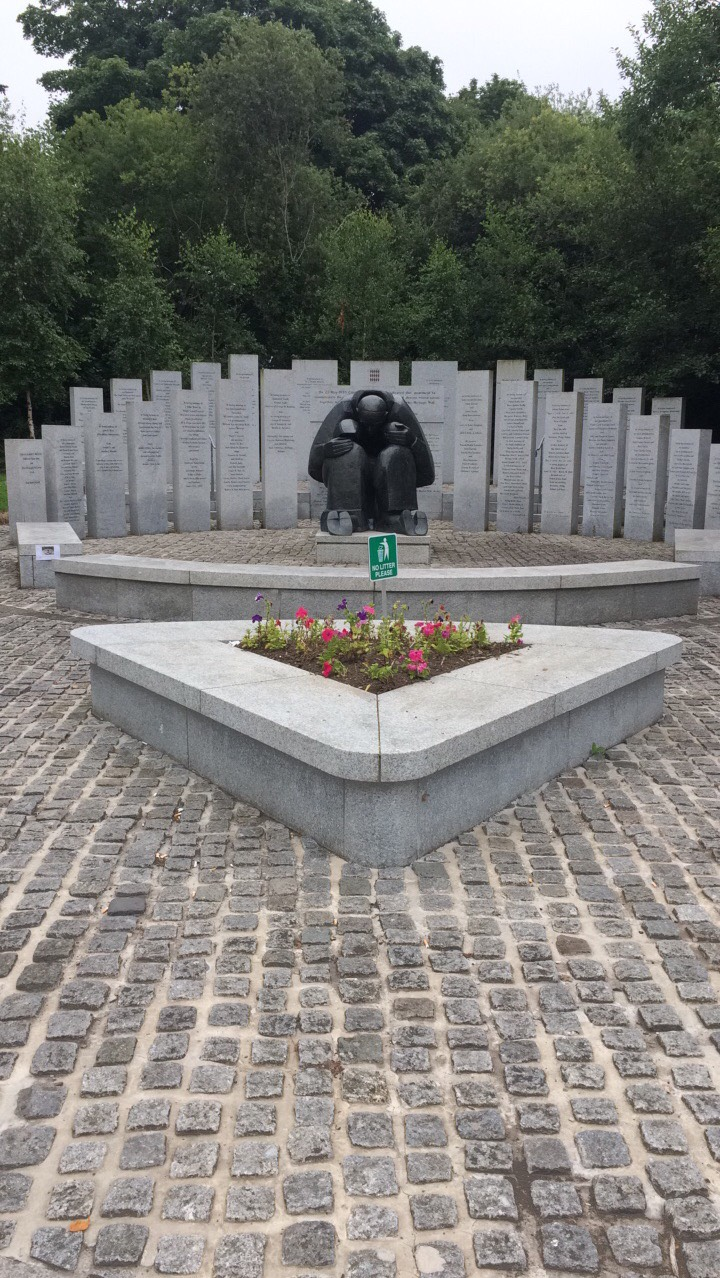
Pope St. John Paul II statue at Maynooth University

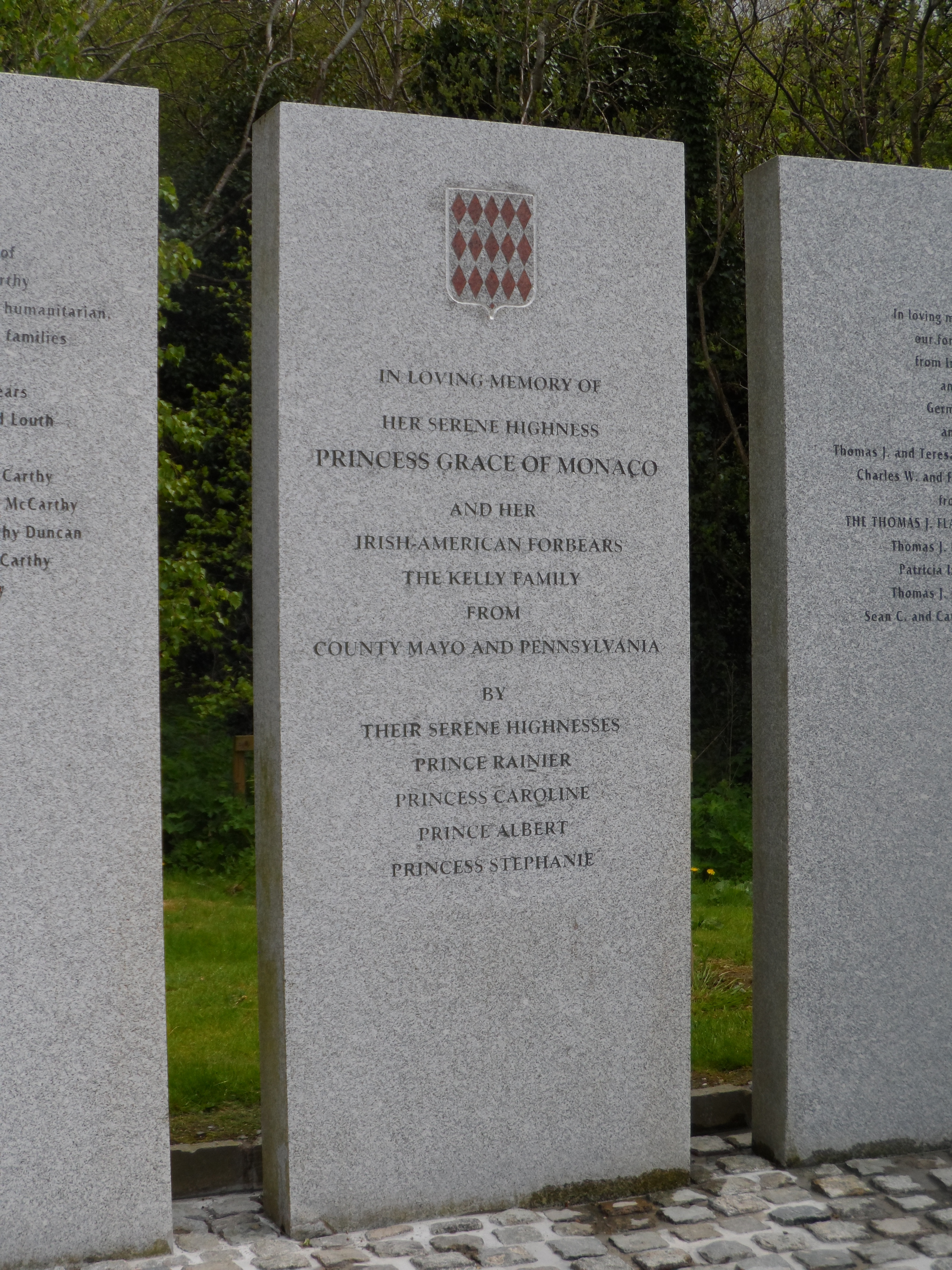
Memorial stone to Grace Kelly and her Irish-American ancestors

== See also ==
- Education in the Republic of Ireland
- List of universities in the Republic of Ireland
- National University of Ireland
- St Patrick's College, Maynooth
- Royal University of Ireland
- Catholic University of Ireland
