= Richard Higgott =

Researcher. professor and academic leader

Professor Richard Higgott was born in 1949 in Nottingham, UK. He is based in the Brussels School of Governance, the Vrije Universiteit Brussel where he is Distinguished Professor of Diplomacy. From 2020 he has been a Visiting Professor in the Department of Social, Political and Cognitive Sciences at the University of Siena in Italy. He is also a part-time Visiting Fellow at the Robert Schuman Center at the European University Institute.

He is an elected Fellow of the UK Academy of Social Sciences.

Professor Higgott is a former Fulbright Fellow at the Kennedy School of Government. He has been National Director of the Australian Institute of International Affairs and Vice President of the USA International Studies Association. He was also, for 1989–90, the President of the Australasian Political Studies Association.

Other academic appointments include the University of Manchester (Professor of Government); the Research School of Pacific and Asian Studies, Australian National University (Professor in International Relations and Public Policy and Director of Studies for the Australian Department of Foreign Affairs and Trade) as well as at the University of Western of Australia. Sub-professorial career positions include those at the Kennedy School of Government, Harvard University, the University of Tasmania and the University of Western Australia.

He has edited three peer-reviewed journals: The Australian Journal of International Affairs, Global Governance, and, for over 20 years, The Pacific Review. He is the author and/or editor and co-editor of some 20 volumes including Political Development Theory; Why We Cannot Govern the Global Economy; Relocating Middle Powers: Australia and Canada in the World Order; Towards a Global Polity; the 2-volume Handbook of Globalisation and 4 volume International Relations of the Asia Pacific.

In June 2011, Higgott took up the position of Vice-Chancellor, the chief officer, of Murdoch University in Western Australia. He was appointed with a mandate to reform the institution, raise standards, improve the university research reputation and international standing. During his time in office there was a significant improvement in Murdoch University's rankings; notably it rose in the ‘Worlds Top 100 universities under 50’ debuting high at 57th in 2013.

During the reform process to either promote or attract world class researchers to improve international rank of the university, he was accused in anonymous letters that he had appointed a professor to a senior university position who was a former colleague of his. He resigned in October 2014. Another senior officer at Murdoch, Mr Jon Baldwin (previously at Warwick University) also left his position early.

Concurrently the Corruption and Crime Commission (CCC) initiated an investigation into Murdoch University. On 1 July 2016, ABC News reported that the CCC formed an opinion of misconduct at the university regarding the process of a senior appointment. The successful candidate was deemed by the university selection committee to be the best candidate for the position. The CCC Report also acknowledged that Professor Higgott had informed both the Murdoch University selection committee and also the deputy Chancellor of his prior professional relationship with the candidate in an international research project and as co-authors. However, the belief of the University Senate was that Professor Higgott sought to have this person appointed Additionally, the CCC found that Professor Higgott had breached Murdoch University's code of conduct for university laptop use.

The CCC investigation concluded that problems lay with other actors in the university, such as failed oversight by its Senate stating that it was "a Senate (that) fails to effectively articulate the parameters within which a Vice-Chancellor should act". The national business media suggested that the then newly appointed Chancellor, David Flanagan, a miner who was not experienced in university governance, was "more local and closer to the parochial sentiments of Perth", ill-suited to the pursuit of international talent and high educational standards. An opinion article in The Australian depicted Professor Higgott as 'A Colleague who Cared' and portrayed the investigation as a consequence of "bossy neoliberal governments" where "scholarly freedom is jeopardised".
