= Merfyn Jones =

Welsh historian and broadcaster

R. Merfyn Jones CBE (born January 1948) is a Welsh historian and broadcaster, was vice-chancellor of Bangor University (2004 to 2010) and a governor of the BBC (2003 to 2006).

He grew up and still lives in Gwynedd, Wales.

== Academic career ==
Jones has specialized as an historian in modern and contemporary Welsh history, and has made several TV documentaries in this area. He has a particular interest is the history of the process of devolution (the establishing and development of the National Assembly for Wales) in Wales.

His books and articles include The North Wales Quarrymen 1874-1922 (University of Wales Press, 1981), which was awarded the Welsh Arts Council prize for literature. This book provides an analysis of the economic importance of slate extraction to North Wales and also of the rise of trades unionism in the area (and covers the industrial dispute at Penrhyn Quarry of 1900–03).

He graduated at the University of Sussex and the University of Warwick. He lectured at the University of Wales, Swansea and was a lecturer, head of department and dean at the University of Liverpool.

=== Vice Chancellor of Bangor University ===
Jones joined the University of Wales, Bangor in 1990 as a senior lecturer in history. He became head of the School of Welsh History there in 1993 and was appointed to the chair in Welsh history in 1994. He then served as Dean of Arts and Social Sciences for two years before being appointed Pro-Vice Chancellor in 1998. He was acting vice-chancellor in 2003.

Jones was appointed as the sixth vice-chancellor of the University of Wales, Bangor in 2004. In September 2007 he oversaw the change in Bangor's status, from a College of the University of Wales to a university in its own right, renamed as Bangor University. In his capacity as Vice-Chancellor, Jones was the Welsh Supernumerary Fellow of Jesus College, Oxford in the academic year 2004–05. Jones retired as Vice Chancellor in 2010.

=== First Chairman of Coleg Cymraeg Cenedlaethol ===
Jones was appointed as the first Chair of Coleg Cymraeg Cenedlaethol (the National Welsh Language College). The Coleg, which launched on 1 April 2011, works with the Welsh universities to increase opportunities for students to study through the Welsh language; and is a major component of the Welsh Assembly Government's strategy for higher education, 'For our Future'.

== Broadcasting ==
Jones regularly broadcasts on the BBC and S4C. His broadcasts include broadcasts in the Welsh language.

In 2000, Jones presented a 13-part television series for S4C, entitled Cymru 2000. This was a history of 20th century Wales, which featured over 200 interviews with notable figures from Wales' recent history. He was also responsible for writing the book of the same name that accompanied the series. Cymru 2000 received a BAFTA Cymru award in 2000 for "outstanding contribution to history on television".

This was followed by several other television series, including 'Y Streic Fawr', 'Llafur Gwlad' and 'I'r Gad!'.

=== BBC Governor ===
On 1 January 2003, Jones was appointed to the Board of Governors of the BBC as BBC National Governor for Wales. He held that position until the end of 2006 when the BBC's Board of Governors was dissolved and replaced by the BBC Trust.

Jones was a member of the nominations committee established to appoint the new Director General of the BBC. According to Greg Dyke (BBC director-general), Jones was one of the governors responsible for his departure after the Hutton report 'exonerated' Tony Blair and Alastair Campbell from 'sexing up', exaggerating, the threat of Iraq's weapons of mass destruction [ref: Greg Dyke, Inside Story, p. 318]

== Chair of the Betsi Cadwaladr University Health Board ==
Jones was chair of the Betsi Cadwaladr University Health Board, a local Health Board responsible for health services for around 694,000 people across north Wales. He took up his appointment on 1 April 2013. A report in 2013 by the Healthcare Inspectorate Wales and the Wales Audit Office found that leadership at the board was "fundamentally compromised" because the relationship between the chairman and chief executive had broken down. Following this report, Jones stood down as Chair of the Health Board; the Chief Executive, Mary Burrows, also resigned.

== Honours ==
Jones was appointed Commander of the Order of the British Empire (CBE) in the 2011 Birthday Honours for services to higher education in Wales.

Jones is an Honorary Fellow of Coleg Cymraeg Cenedlaethol in recognition of his contribution to Welsh medium higher education. In addition to his contribution as one of the most prominent historians of modern Wales, the Coleg also cites his achievements as Chairman of the Coleg: he "played an integral part in establishing the Coleg as a national body. He emphasized particularly the principle that every academic discipline can be taught and debated through the medium of Welsh, a principle that is now central to the Coleg’s academic strategy."

In July 2016, Jones was made an Honorary Fellow of Bangor University for services to the university.
