= Christopher Chambers =

British neuroscientist

Christopher Chambers is Professor of Cognitive Neuroscience at Cardiff University, where he is also Head of the CUBRIC Brain Stimulation Group. He is a Fellow of the British Psychological Society (elected in 2011), and the winner of the society's Spearman Medal in 2007.

== Biography ==
Chambers has a BSc from Monash University (awarded in 1998), and a Ph.D, also from Monash, awarded in 2002. He was a postdoctoral fellow at the University of Melbourne from 2002 to 2006.

== Publications ==
His most cited papers are

- Christopher D. Chambers; Mark A. Bellgrove; Mark G. Stokes; Tracy R. Henderson; Hugh Garavan; Ian H. Robertson; Adam P. Morris; Jason B. Mattingley (2006). "Executive 'Brake Failure' following Deactivation of Human Frontal Lobe" (PDF). Journal of Cognitive Neuroscience. 18 (3): 444–55. doi:10.1162/jocn.2006.18.3.444. PMID 16513008. S2CID 14797392.. According to Google Scholar, this paper has been cited 346 times.
- C.D. Chambers; H. Garavan; M.A. Bellgrove (2009). "Insights into the neural basis of response inhibition from cognitive and clinical neuroscience". Neuroscience & Biobehavioral Reviews. 33 (5): 631–46. doi:10.1016/j.neubiorev.2008.08.016. PMID 18835296. S2CID 14355988. Cited 335 times.
