= C. W. L. Bevan =

Welsh chemist, academic, and academic administrator

Bill Bevan CBE FRSA
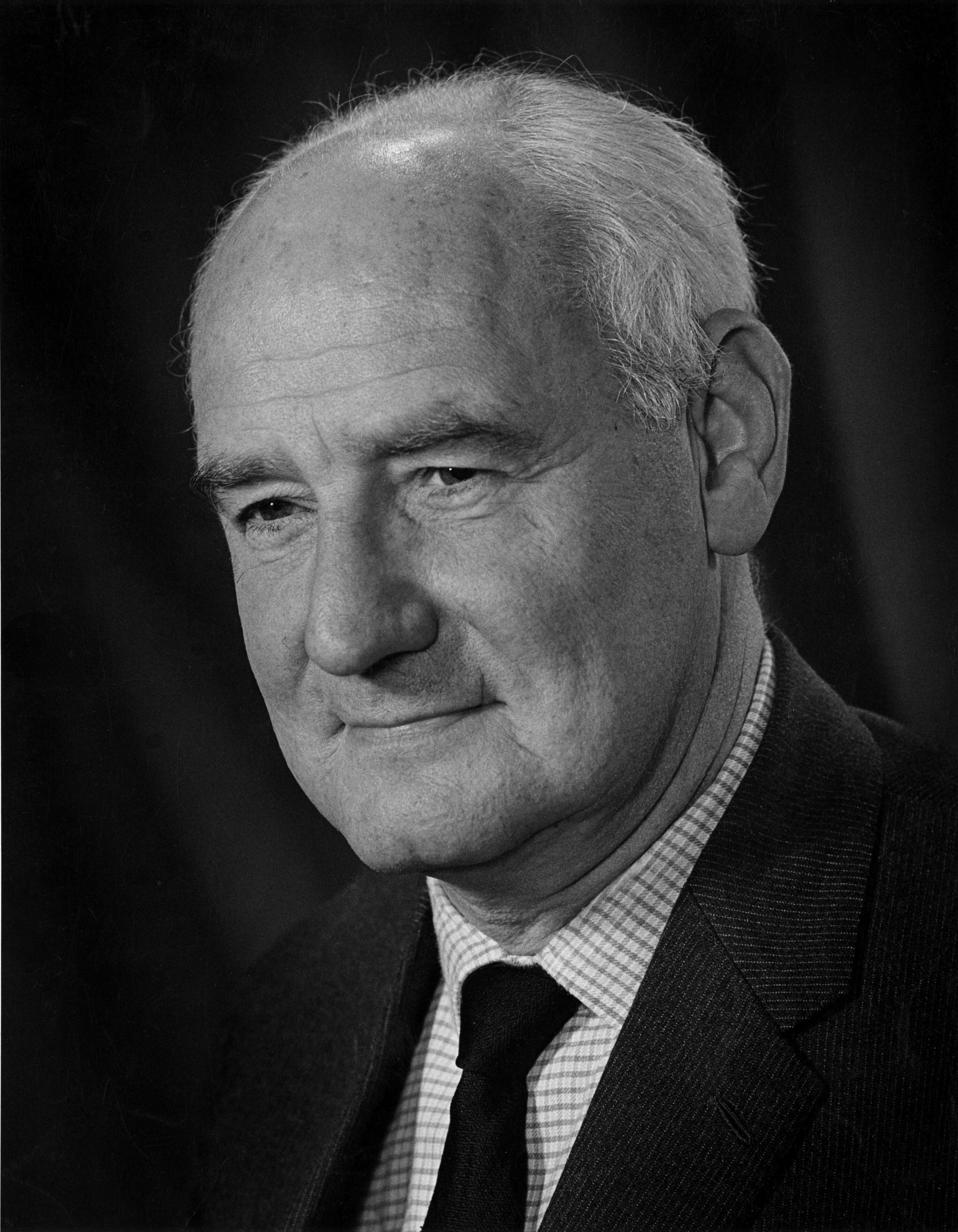
- Bevan, c. 1980s
- Born: Cecil Wilfrid Luscombe Bevan; 2 April 1920
- Died: 19 April 1989 (aged 69)
- Scientific career
- Fields: Chemistry
- Workplaces: University of Exeter; University of Ibadan; University College, Cardiff

Principal of University College, Cardiff
- In office 1966–1987
- Preceded by: Anthony Steel
- Succeeded by: post abolished ^{a}

Vice-chancellor of University of Wales
- In office 1981–1983
- In office 1973–1975

Notes
- ^{a} University College, Cardiff merged with University of Wales Institute of Science and Technology to become University of Wales College of Cardiff in 1988.

Cecil Wilfrid Luscombe "Bill" Bevan CBE FRSA (2 April 1920 – 19 April 1989) was a Welsh chemist, academic, and academic administrator. He was Principal of University College, Cardiff from 1966 to 1987. He was additionally Vice-Chancellor of the University of Wales for two terms: 1973 to 1975 and 1981 to 1983.

== Academic career ==
Bevan worked at the University of Exeter from 1949 to 1953, before moving to the University of Ibadan in Nigeria. He was head of its Department of Chemistry from 1953 and 1966, and its Vice Principal and Deputy Vice-Chancellor from 1960 to 1964.

== Honours ==
In the 1965 New Year Honours, Bevan was appointed a Commander of the Order of the British Empire (CBE). He was made an officer of the Ordre des Palmes Académiques by the government of France in 1986.

In 1969, Bevan was made a Fellow of University College London (UCL); this is an honorary appointment recognising "distinction in the arts, literature, science, business or public life". In 1971, he was elected as fellow of the Royal Society of Arts. He was awarded an honorary Doctor of Science (DSc) degree in 1973 by the University of Ibadan. In 1982, he was made an Honorary Fellow of University College, Cardiff.

== Selected works ==
- Cecil Wilfred Luscombe Bevan (1965). Intermediate Practical Chemistry. Nelson.
