= Anthony Steel (historian) =

British historian

Anthony Steel OBE CStJ
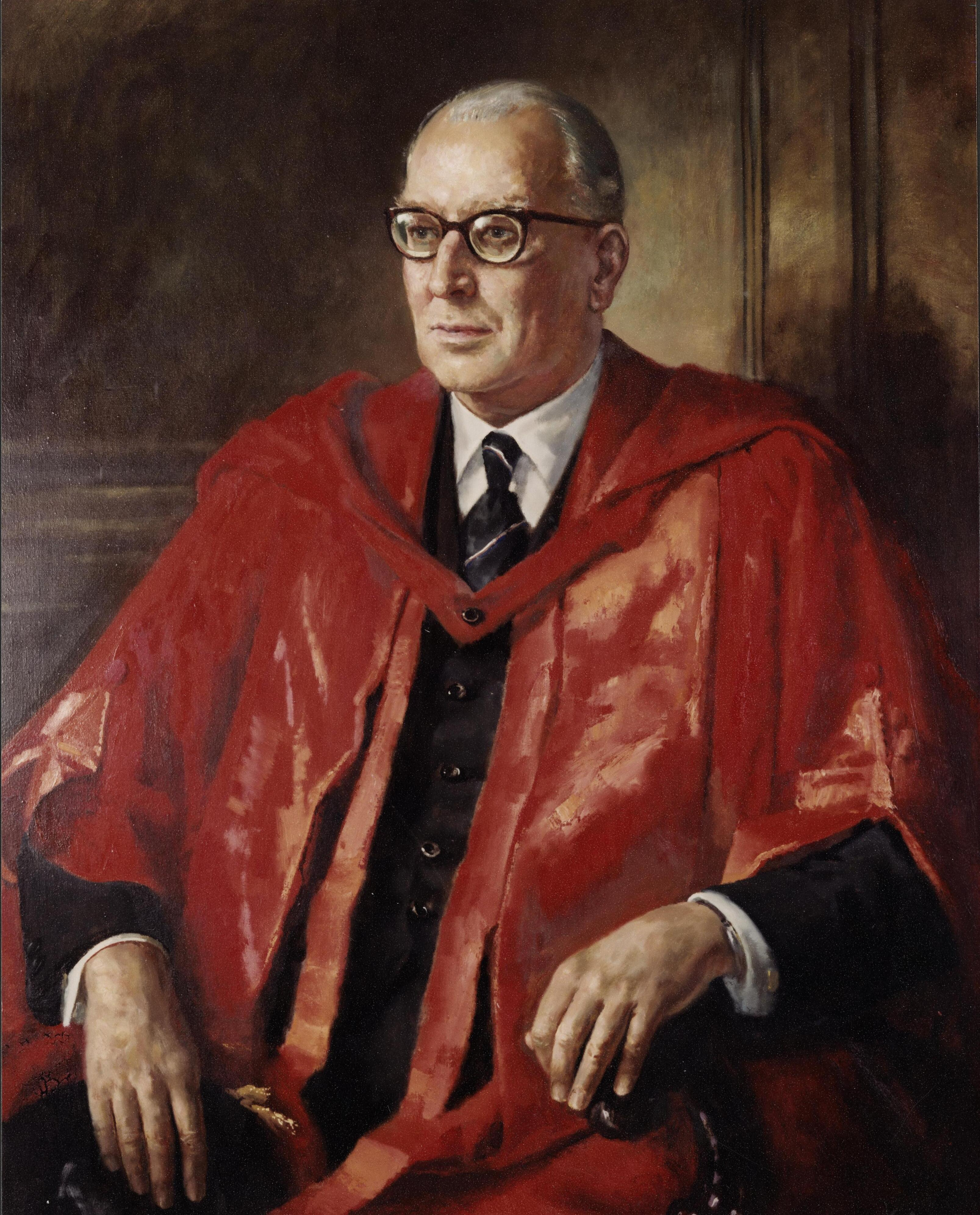
- Steel, c. 1950-60s
- Born: Anthony Bedford Steel; 24 February 1900
- Died: 3 October 1973 (aged 73)
- Spouse: Eileen M. Johnson (m. 1924)
- Children: 1

Academic background
- Education: Rugby School; New College, Oxford

Academic work
- Discipline: History
- Sub-discipline: Medieval English history
- Institutions: Christ's College, Cambridge; University College of South Wales and Monmouthshire, Wales
- Notable students: A. Rupert Hall; Michael Manktelow

Vice-chancellor of University College of South Wales and Monmouthshire, Wales
- In office 1949–1966
- Preceded by: Frederick Rees
- Succeeded by: C. W. L. Bevan

Anthony Bedford Steel OBE CStJ (24 February 1900 – 3 October 1973) was a British historian, specialising in medieval England. He was a fellow of Christ's College, Cambridge, and principal of University College of South Wales and Monmouthshire from 1949 to 1966. Among his publications were a monograph on the reign of Richard II, as well as a biography of the 19th-century writer Robert Smith Surtees, titled Jorrick's England. He also translated Albert Sorel's L'Europe et la Revolution Francaise into English (as Europe and the French Revolution).

== Early life and education ==
Steel was born in India to Ethel Mary Steel (née Robinson) and Major Edwin Beford Steel, a doctor in the British Army, who was stationed in India at the time. He had a younger sister, Rachel Mary, and a younger brother, Christopher Bedford. Major Steel was in active service with the Royal Army Medical Corps during World War I and died of his battlefield wounds in 1914. Steel himself went on to serve as Second lieutenant in the Royal Army Service Corps towards the end of the war from 1918 to 1919, which took him to France and Germany.

Steel was educated at Rugby School before attending New College, Oxford, where he earned First-class honours in Literae humaniores. He also held an MA from the University of Cambridge.

== Career ==
In 1924, Steel was appointed as Fellow of Christ's College, Cambridge, where he also worked as a lecturer of history until 1949. He served as Senior Proctor of the college in 1937/38 and as Steward from 1937 to 1939.

At the outbreak of World War II, Steel was seconded to the Ministry of Information. From 1940 to 1945, he worked at British Council as representative for London, Eastern, and Southeastern England. He returned to Christ's College to work as a tutor after the end of the war.

At Cambridge, Steel was the supervisor of the historian A. Rupert Hall. Another notable student was Michael Manktelow, future Bishop of Basingstoke.

Steel was appointed as Principal of University College of South Wales and Monmouthshire, Wales in Cardiff in 1949, succeeding Frederick Rees. In the early days of this appointment, his comments on the radio about the college's growth, advocating for the teaching of foreign languages, geography, and law at the college attracted media attention, notably being quoted in the local paper South Wales Echo:

A university is a living body which must keep on growing to be healthy. If it stops growing it falls sick and decays. Through no fault of its own the University College, Cardiff, has already had to stand still dangerously long.

Cardiff is a great port and I think we should teach Spanish as well as French, German, and Italian. Spanish is commercially more important than any other language except English. Possibly we could also tackle Russian for literary and political reasons and enlarge our present department of Semitic studies (mainly Arabic and Hebrew) into a real school of Oriental languages.

It would be natural that the University of Wales should allow us to teach geography. But at present we are not allowed to, and we are greatly restricted in our teaching of the elements of law. I should like to see a properly-equipped department of geography and a real school of law here in Cardiff. Surely it is only common sense that the present university restriction on our teaching of law should be relaxed?

During his time in Cardiff, he also served as Vice-chancellor of the University of Wales for two terms, from 1956 to 1958 and from 1959 to 1961.

== Personal life and death ==
Steel married Eileen Maud Johnson in 1924. Their son was educated at University of Oxford and went on to marry Elisabeth Tesni, daughter of Sir Wynne Cemlyn-Jones.

Steel died on 3 October 1973.

== Honours ==
Steel was appointed as Officer of the Order of the British Empire in the 1946 New Year Honours, for his role as Regional representative for London, East Anglia and the Home Counties at British Council. He was appointed as a Commander of the Most Venerable Order of the Hospital of Saint John of Jerusalem in 1953.

== Publications ==
- Jorrocks's England: On the Works of Robert Smith Surtees (London: Methuen & Co., 1932).
- Richard II (Cambridge: Cambridge University Press, 1941).
- The Custom of the Room; or, Early Wine-Books of Christ's College, Cambridge (Cambridge: W. Heffer & Sons 1951).
- The Receipt of the Exchequer, 1377–1485 (Cambridge: Cambridge University Press, 1954).

Academic offices
Preceded by Sir Frederick Rees	Principal of the University College of South Wales and Monmouthshire, Wales; 1949–1966	Succeeded by C. W. L. Bevan
