= CUBRIC =

Brain imaging centre in Cardiff, Wales

Cardiff University Brain Research Imaging Centre
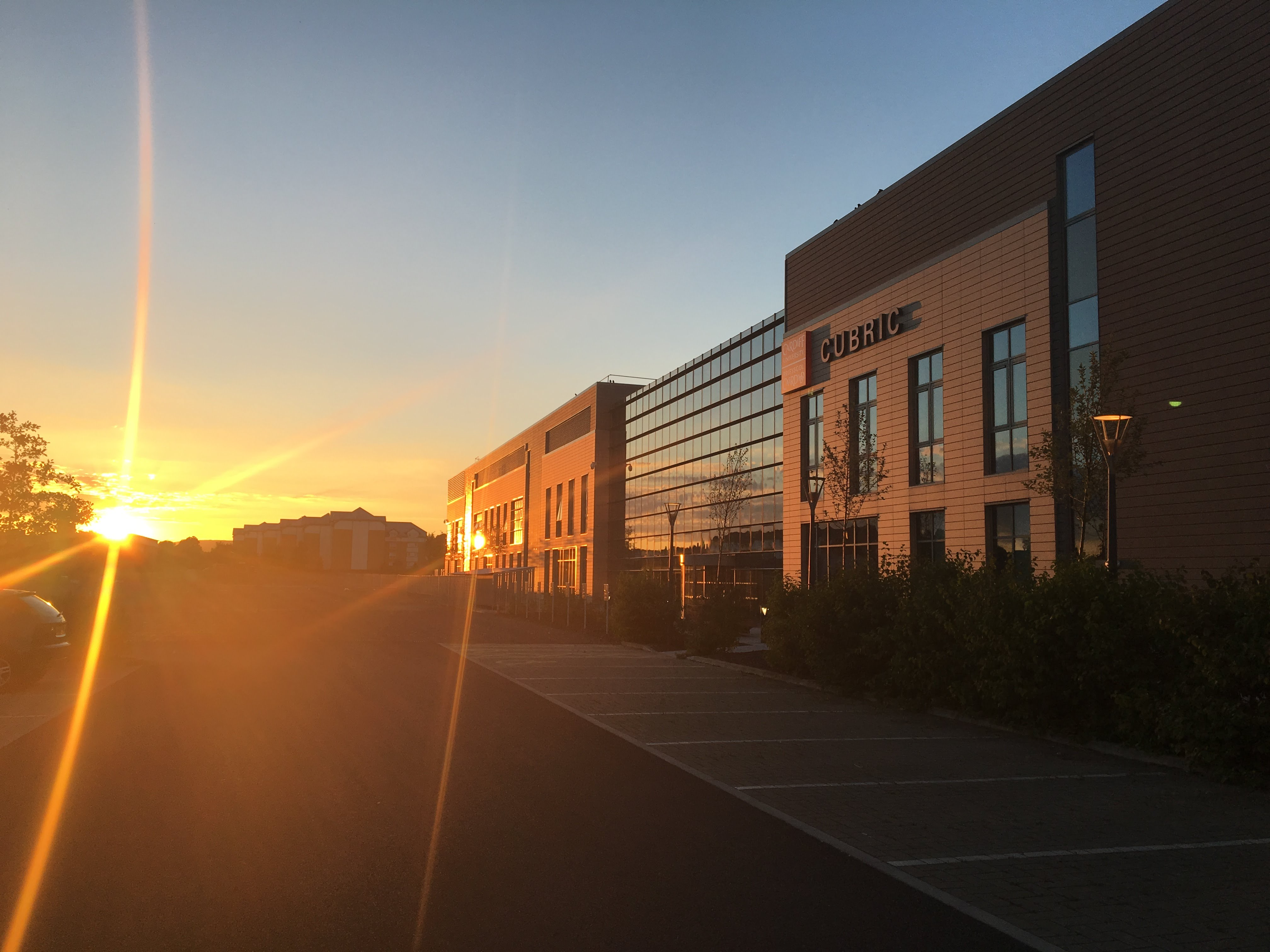
- Other name: CUBRIC
- Cost of Construction: £44,000,000
- Architect: IBI Group
- Contractor: BAM Construction
- Type: Brain Imaging Centre
- Established: 2006
- Parent institution: Cardiff University
- Director: Prof. Derek Jones
- Location: Maindy Road, Cardiff, Cardiff, Wales, CF24 4HQ, United Kingdom; 51°29′34″N 3°11′4″W
- Website: CUBRIC - Cardiff University

The Cardiff University Brain Research Imaging Centre (CUBRIC) is a brain imaging centre, part of Cardiff University's Science and Innovation Campus in Cardiff, Wales, United Kingdom. When it expanded in 2016, it was considered the most advanced brain imaging centre in Europe.

== Building ==
=== Construction ===
CUBRIC was established in the Cathays Park campus of Cardiff University in 2006, and moved to a new building in the Maindy Park campus in June 2016. The new building was constructed on old railway land, with the railway aiding in the delivery of the larger scanners. It cost £44,000,000, partially funded by Cardiff University, and partially by the Welsh Government. It was officially opened by Queen Elizabeth II on 7 June 2016.

=== Awards ===
The new building was awarded the title of Life Science Research Building 2017 by the UK Science Park Association. It also received the "Project of the Year" and "Design Through Innovation" awards from the Royal Institution of Chartered Surveyors, who praised it for its "precise and beautifully detailed multi-sensory design". It was also a contender for the National Eisteddfod of Wales Gold Medal for Architecture in 2017. It has been designed to create a relaxing environment volunteers, with large windows and timber structures.

== Research ==
Cardiff University's School of Psychology created CUBRIC to facilitate interdisciplinary brain research, using multiple neuroimaging machines and laboratory techniques. The centre houses:

- 4 machines for magnetic resonance imaging (MRI)
- magnetoencephalography (MEG)
- electroencephalography (EEG) research
- 5 electrical brain stimulation (EBS) laboratories
- 10 cognitive method laboratories
- the first connectome scanner outside the United States, a Siemens 3-tesla Connectom system.

A range of cognitive neuroscience studies are being carried out at CUBRIC, covering areas such as sleep research and curiosity research. The centre aims to investigate neurological aspects of conditions such as epilepsy, Alzheimer's disease, schizophrenia, multiple sclerosis, and dementia. One of the centre's first major research projects in the new building involved the study of Huntington's disease.

The connectome scanner generates a map of the axons in white matter, connections of the brain, by measuring the nearby movement of water molecules to 1/1000 millimetre (3.9×10^{−5} in) precision. Anomalous structures and changes to the brain's function, called biomarkers, can be identified through comparison to scans of healthy brains.
