= Cardiff University =

Public research university in Wales

- Welsh: Prifysgol Caerdydd
- Coat of arms
- Former names: University College of South Wales and Monmouthshire (1893–1972); University College, Cardiff (1972–1988); University of Wales College, Cardiff (1988–1996); University of Wales, Cardiff (1996–2005)
- Motto: Welsh: Gwirionedd, Undod a Chytgord
- Motto in English: Truth, Unity and Concord
- Type: Public
- Established: 1883; 143 years ago (college); 2005; 21 years ago (independent university status)
- Academic affiliations: ACU; EUA; GW4; Russell Group; Universities UK; Defence Universities Alliance
- Endowment: £53.5 million (2025)
- Budget: £627.7 million (2024/25)
- Chancellor: Laura Trevelyan
- Vice-Chancellor: Wendy Larner
- Academic staff: 3,880 (2024/25)
- Administrative staff: 3,630 (2024/25)
- Students: 31,505 (2024/25); 28,020 FTE (2024/25)
- Undergraduates: 24,645 (2024/25)
- Postgraduates: 6,860 (2024/25)
- Location: Cardiff, Wales; 51.49°N 3.18°W
- Campus: Urban
Colours
- Website: cardiff.ac.uk

Cardiff University (Welsh: Prifysgol Caerdydd) is a public research university in Cardiff, Wales. It was established in 1883 as the University College of South Wales and Monmouthshire and became a founding college of the University of Wales in 1893. It was renamed University College, Cardiff in 1972 and merged with the University of Wales Institute of Science and Technology in 1988 to become University of Wales College, Cardiff and then University of Wales, Cardiff in 1996. In 1997, it received degree-awarding powers, but held them in abeyance. It adopted the operating name of Cardiff University in 1999; this became its legal name in 2005, when it became an independent university awarding its own degrees.

Cardiff University is the only Welsh member of the Russell Group of research-intensive British universities. Academics and alumni of the university have included four heads of state or government and two Nobel laureates. As of 2023, the university's academics include 17 fellows of the Royal Society, 11 fellows of the Royal Academy of Engineering, 7 fellows of the British Academy, 21 fellows of the Academy of Medical Sciences and 32 fellows of the Academy of Social Sciences.

== History ==
=== University college ===
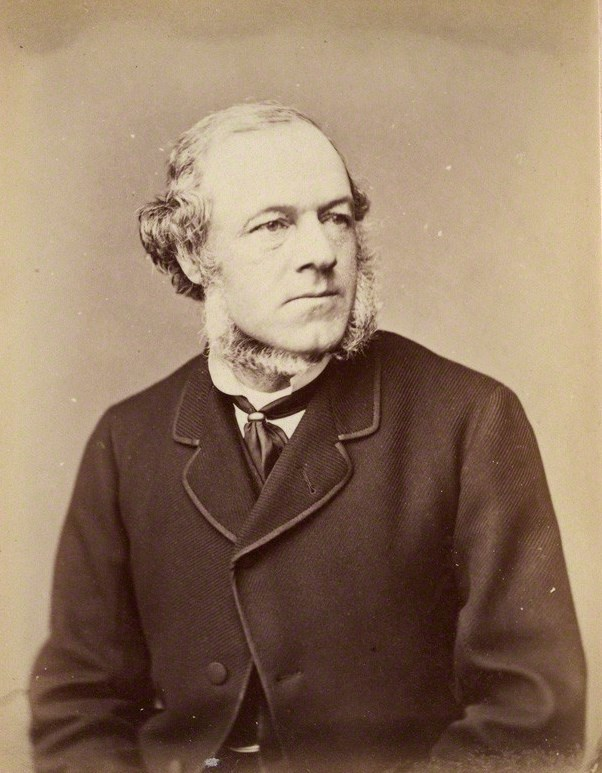
Lord Aberdare was instrumental in the university's founding.

The foundation of the university college in Cardiff that was to become Cardiff University was part of the Welsh university movement of the second half of the 19th century, which also led to the foundation of the colleges at Aberystwyth and Bangor (now Aberystwyth and Bangor universities) and the federal University of Wales. The movement began at a meeting in London in 1854 called by Hugh Owen, including leaders of Welsh theological colleges and members of parliament. This meeting discussed establishing university colleges in Wales along the same lines as the Queen's Colleges established the previous decade in Ireland, and produced a formal proposal, the "Outline of Constitution for Proposed Welsh Queen's Colleges". In October 1872, University College Wales, Aberystwyth opened, with 26 students. Thomas Charles Edwards was the principal. In October 1875, chapels in Wales raised the next tranche of funds from over 70,000 contributors.

Discussions on the founding of a university college in South Wales were revived in 1879, when a group of Welsh and English MPs urged the government to consider the poor provision of higher and intermediate education in Wales and "the best means of assisting any local effort which may be made for supplying such deficiency."

In August 1880, William Ewart Gladstone's government appointed a departmental committee to conduct "an enquiry into the nature and extent of intermediate and higher education in Wales", chaired by the 1st Baron Aberdare and consisting of Viscount Emlyn, the Reverend Prebendary H. G. Robinson, Henry Richard, John Rhys and Lewis Morris. The Aberdare Report, as it came to be known, took evidence from a wide range of sources and over 250 witnesses and recommended a college each for North Wales and South Wales, the latter to be located in Glamorgan and the former to be in a North Wales town to be decided upon; this led to a University College of North Wales at Bangor, now Bangor University, which opened in 1884. The committee cited the unique Welsh national identity and noted that many students in Wales could not afford to travel to University in England or Scotland. It advocated a national degree-awarding university for Wales, composed of regional colleges, which should be non-sectarian in nature and exclude the teaching of theology.

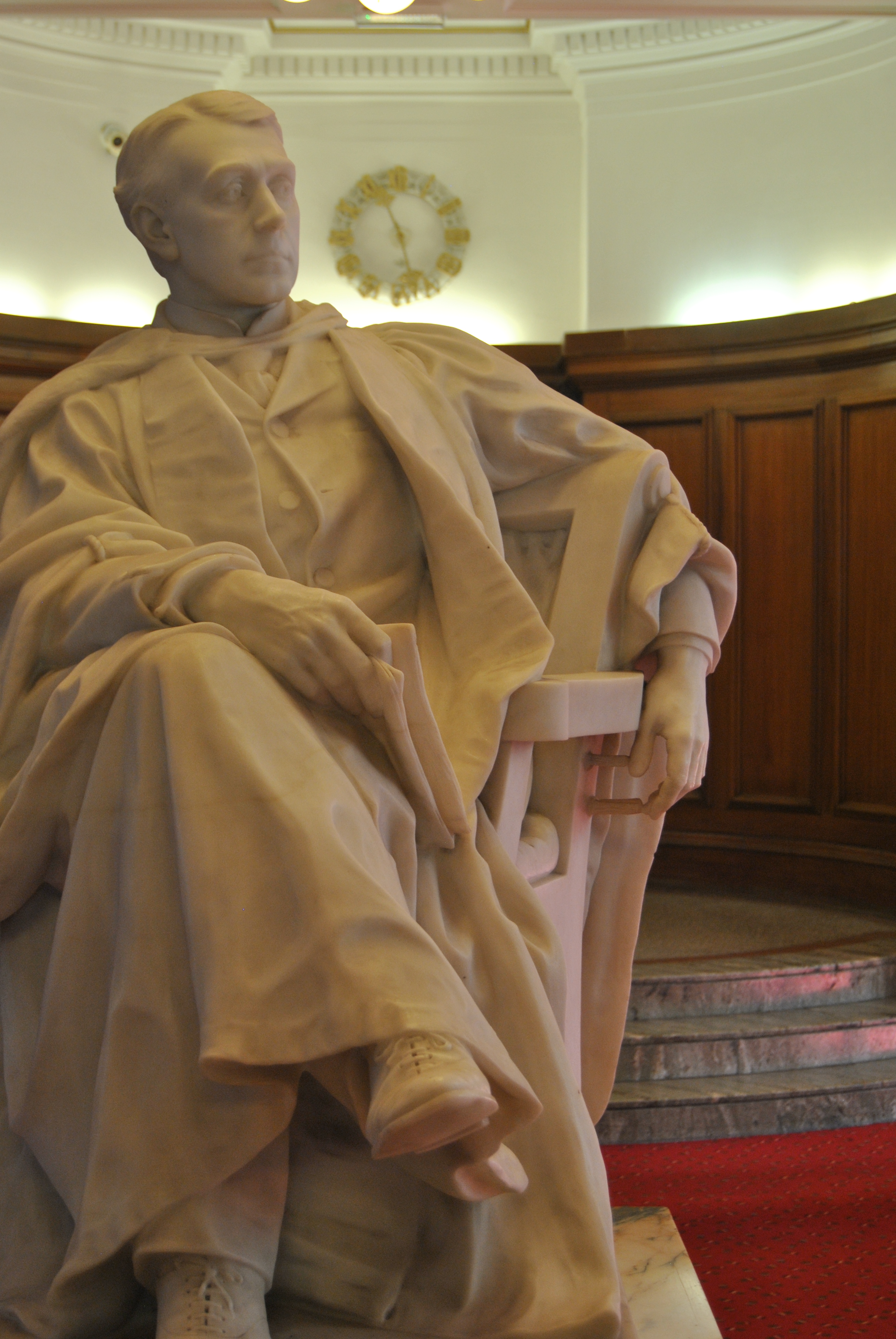
John Viriamu Jones was the founding principal of the college.

After the recommendation was published, Cardiff Corporation sought to secure the location of the college in Cardiff, and on 12 December 1881 formed a University College Committee to aid the matter. There was competition to be the site between Swansea and Cardiff. On 12 March 1883, after arbitration, a decision was made in Cardiff's favour. This was strengthened by the need to consider the interests of Monmouthshire, at that time not legally incorporated into Wales, and the greater sum received by Cardiff in support of the college, through a public appeal that raised £37,000 and a number of private donations, notably from the 3rd Marquess of Bute and Lord Windsor. In April, Lord Aberdare was appointed as the college's first president. The possible locations considered included Cardiff Arms Park, Cathedral Road, and Moira Terrace, Roath, before the site of the Old Royal Infirmary buildings on Newport Road was chosen.

The University College of South Wales and Monmouthshire opened on 24 October 1883 with courses in biology, chemistry, English, French, German, Greek, history, Latin, mathematics and astronomy, music, Welsh, logic and philosophy, and physics. It was incorporated by royal charter the following year; this was the first charter in Wales to allow the enrolment of women and to specifically forbid religious tests for entry. John Viriamu Jones was appointed as the college's first principal at the age of 27. As the college was not an independent university and could not award its own degrees, it prepared its students for the examinations of the University of London or for further study at Oxford or Cambridge.

In 1888 the university college at Cardiff and the University College of North Wales (now Bangor University) proposed to the University College Wales at Aberystwyth joint action to gain a university charter for Wales, modelled on that of the Victoria University, a federal university in northern England with colleges in Manchester, Leeds and Liverpool. This led to a charter being granted to the University of Wales in 1893, with the colleges becoming members of the new university. The position of operational head would rotate among heads of the colleges.

In 1885, Aberdare Hall opened as the first hall of residence, allowing women access to the college. This moved to its current site in 1895, but remains a single-sex hall. In 1904 the college appointed the first female associate professor in the UK, Millicent Mackenzie, who in 1910 became the first female full professor at a fully chartered UK university.

In 1901, John Viriamu Jones persuaded Cardiff Corporation to give the college a five-acre site in Cathays Park (instead of selling it as they would have done otherwise). Soon after, in 1905, work on a new building commenced under the architect W. D. Caröe. Money ran short for the project, however, and although the side-wings were completed in the 1960s the planned great hall was never built. Caroe sought to combine the charm and elegance of his alma mater (Trinity College, Cambridge) with the picturesque balance of many Oxford colleges. On 14 October 1909 the "New College" building in Cathays Park (now Main Building) and the "Drapers' Library" (now the Science Library) was opened in a ceremony involving a procession from the "Old College" in Newport Road.

In 1931, the medical school, founded as part of the college in 1893 along with the departments of anatomy, physiology, pathology and pharmacology, was split off to form the Welsh National School of Medicine, renamed the University of Wales College of Medicine in 1984.

The University College of South Wales and Monmouthshire was renamed University College, Cardiff in 1972.

=== 1988 merger ===
In 1988, University College Cardiff ran into financial difficulties and a declaration of insolvency was considered. This led to a merger with the University of Wales Institute of Science and Technology (UWIST) to form the University of Wales College of Cardiff. The principal of the new institution was Sir Aubrey Trotman-Dickenson, who had been the principal of UWIST. After changes to the constitution in 1996, its name was changed to the University of Wales, Cardiff.

In the early 1990s, the university's computer systems served as the home for The Internet Movie Database.

=== Independence and 2004 merger ===
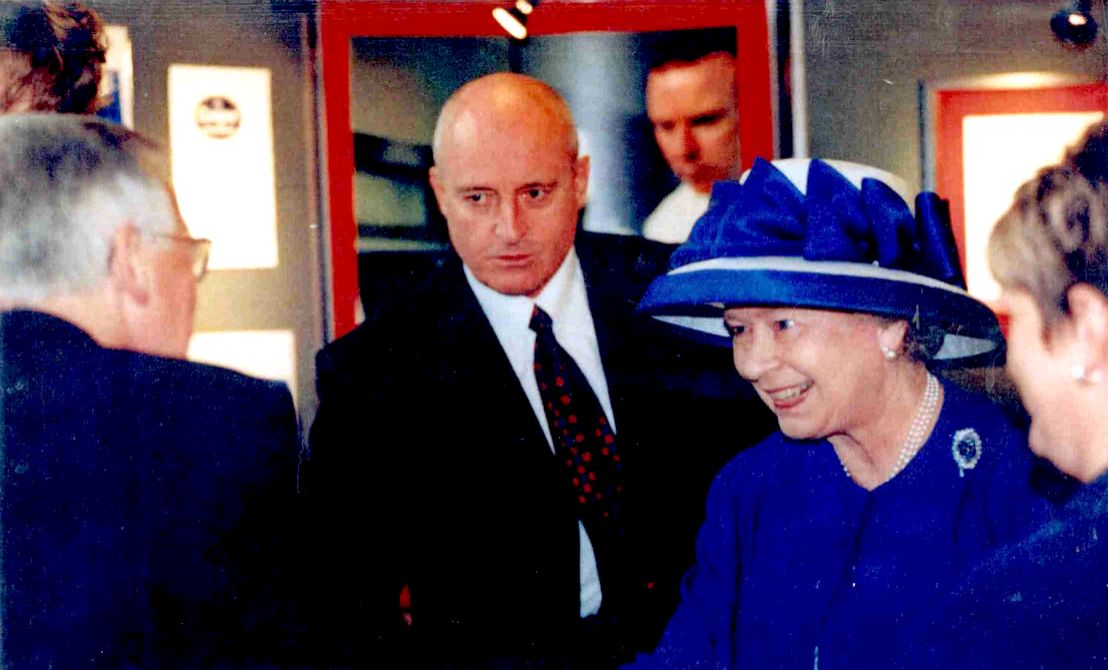
Queen Elizabeth II with Anthony J. Moses during her visit in Cardiff University in 2000

The college was granted degree-awarding powers by the Privy Council in 1997 although, as a member of the University of Wales, it did not use them at that time. In 1999, the public name of the university was changed to Cardiff University.

In 2002, ideas were floated to re-merge Cardiff with the University of Wales College of Medicine (UWCM), after the publication of the Welsh Assembly Government's review of higher education in Wales. This set in train a series of constitutional reforms. On 1 August 2004, Cardiff University ceased to be a member of the University of Wales and became an independent "link institution" affiliated to the federal university. The process of the merger with UWCM was completed on 1 December 2004, when the Act of Parliament transferring UWCM's assets to Cardiff University received royal assent. On 17 December it was announced that the Privy Council had given approval to a new supplemental charter for the keys institution. This was sealed on 11 March 2005, granting university status to Cardiff and legally changing the name of the institution to Cardiff University. Cardiff awarded University of Wales degrees to students admitted before 2005, but has subsequently awarded its own degrees.

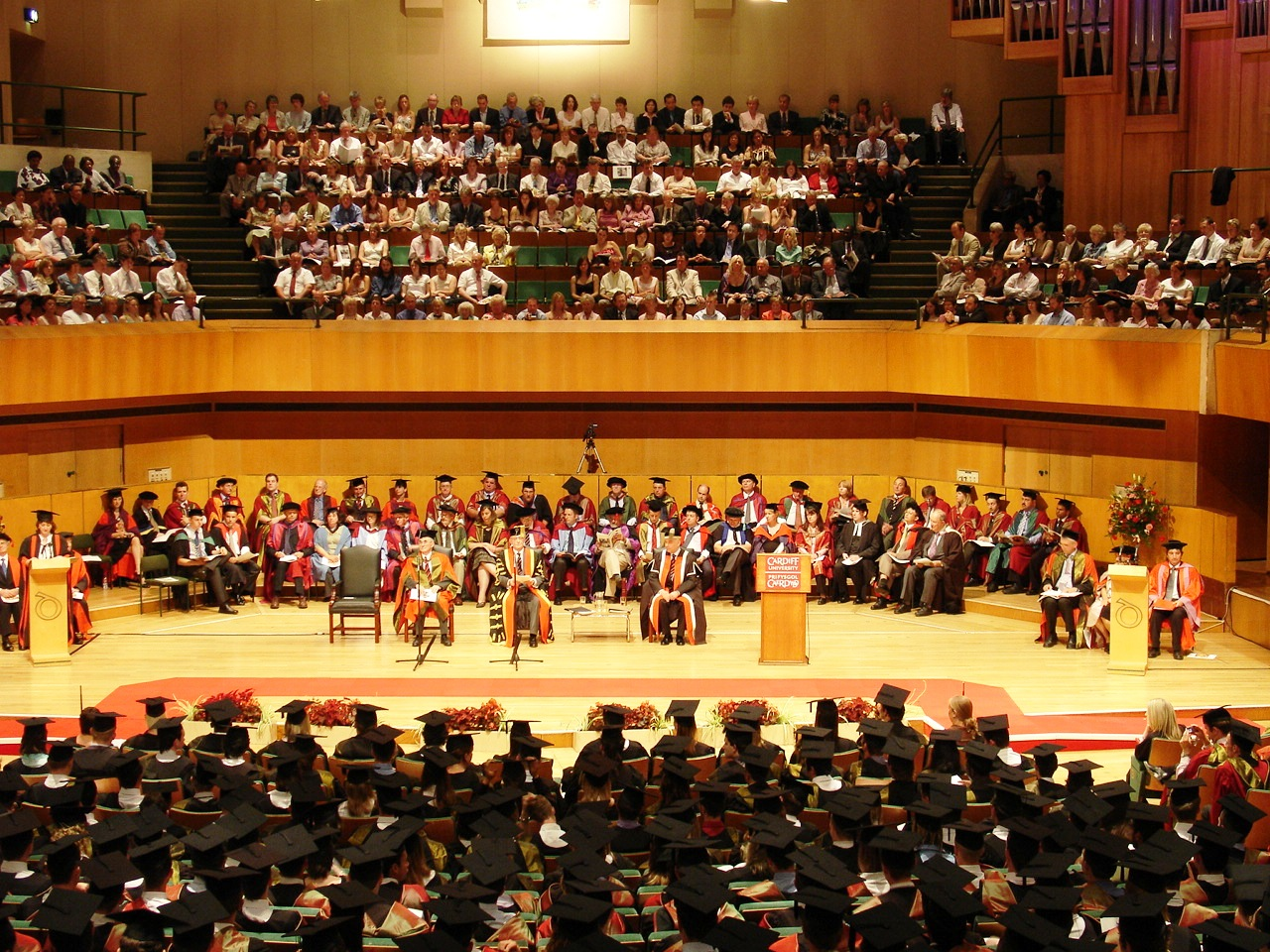
A Cardiff University graduation ceremony in 2006

In 2005, Wales College of Medicine, as part of the university, launched the North Wales Clinical School in Wrexham, in collaboration with the North East Wales Institute of Higher Education in Wrexham, the University of Wales, Bangor, and the National Health Service in Wales. This received funds of £12.5 million from the Welsh Assembly and trebled the number of trainee doctors in clinical training in Wales over a four-year period.

The university also has a Centre for Lifelong Learning, which has been teaching a wide range of courses for over 125 years. However, in July 2009, the university announced it was ending over 250 humanities courses at the centre, making over 100 staff redundant. The university has since reintroduced a number of humanities courses for a trial period beginning in 2010.

In June 2010, the university launched three new research institutes, each offering a new approach to a major modern research issue. The Neurosciences and Mental Health Research Institute and the Cancer Stem Cell Research Institute are housed in the purpose-built Hadyn Ellis Building and in the Sustainable Places Research Institute. Another part of the Science and Development Campus, the Cardiff University Brain Research Imaging Centre (CUBRIC), opened in June 2016 for neuroimaging research.

=== Workload controversy ===
On 19 February 2018, Malcolm Anderson, a university lecturer committed suicide at age 48 by jumping off a university building. The inquiry determined that Anderson's suicide was the result of a high-pressure workload.

In 2020, Grace Krause, a PhD student employed at Cardiff University started experiencing headaches and back pain after lengthy work at a computer. She tweeted that "Staff are marking hundreds of essays in an impossibly short time. It is exhausting. Everyone is in crisis mode. Stressed, moody, morose, everyone feels like they're drowning." Soon after, an email from the university was sent to all PhD students asking for these comments to be deleted, in order to avoid negative media attention, which sparked a debate about freedom of speech between employers and employees.

=== 2025 cost-cutting measures ===
Cardiff University announced in January 2025 that it had an operating deficit of £31.2 million for 2023–24 and announced a three-month consultation on plans to reduce its academic workforce by approximately 400 full-time equivalent positions, representing around 7 per cent of its total staff, as well as discontinuing programs in ancient history, modern languages and translation, music, nursing, and religion and theology, and merging other academic departments. The Arts and Humanities are expected to suffer most severely, with the remaining workforce to be reduced by approximately 120 full-time equivalent positions, which is around half. The university had around £500 million in unrestricted reserves according to its accounts for 2023–24, which the Universities and Colleges Union said should be partially used to give a longer period for the university's finances to recover. However, the university said that "unrestricted reserves" was not the same as cash available to spend. The university's accounts contain the statement that "Of the University's £426m of cash and investments as at 31 July 2024, £41m is freely available to spend." A document circulated internally but leaked to the press revealed that further job losses in non-academic staff were expected on top of the 400 academic staff posts and outlined plans for a smaller but higher-quality student intake in future. It also revealed that the projected deficit for 2024–25, if no action was taken, was £65 million, double the deficit for 2023–24, with the cuts designed to reduce the deficit to £28 million.

In May, the university announced that it would reduce the impact of its cuts by continuing to offer some courses that were previously due to be cancelled, including Nursing, Music, and Modern Languages. The university also agreed to not make any compulsory redundancies in 2025, following a deal with the UCU to drop plans industrial action in the summer.

The university's deficit is part of the wider financial challenges in the UK higher education sector, where universities are facing budget deficits due to factors such as tuition fee caps, rising operational costs, and fluctuations in student enrolment. Other institutions, have also announced staff reductions and course closures. The proposed cuts at Cardiff also led to protests at the Senedd, where the Welsh Government said that there was no more money available for higher education despite universities across Wales suffering financial crises and implementing job cuts and campus closures.

=== Vice chancellors and principals ===
List of Vice-Chancellors and Principals of Cardiff University and its predecessors (shown in brackets):

- 1883–1901 (University College of South Wales and Monmouthshire): John Viriamu Jones
- 1901–1918 (University College of South Wales and Monmouthshire): Ernest Howard Griffiths
- 1918–1929 (University College of South Wales and Monmouthshire): Albert Howard Trow
- 1929–1949 (University College of South Wales and Monmouthshire): Frederick Rees
- 1949–1966 (University College of South Wales and Monmouthshire): Anthony Steel
- 1966–1972 (University College of South Wales and Monmouthshire): C. W. L. Bevan
- 1972–1987 (University College Cardiff): C. W. L. Bevan
- 1968–1988 (University of Wales Institute of Science and Technology): Sir Aubrey Trotman-Dickenson
- 1988–1993: Aubrey Trotman-Dickenson
- 1993–2001: Brian Smith
- 2001–2012: David Grant
- 2012–2023: Colin Riordan
- 2023–present: Wendy Larner

== Campus ==
=== Academic facilities ===
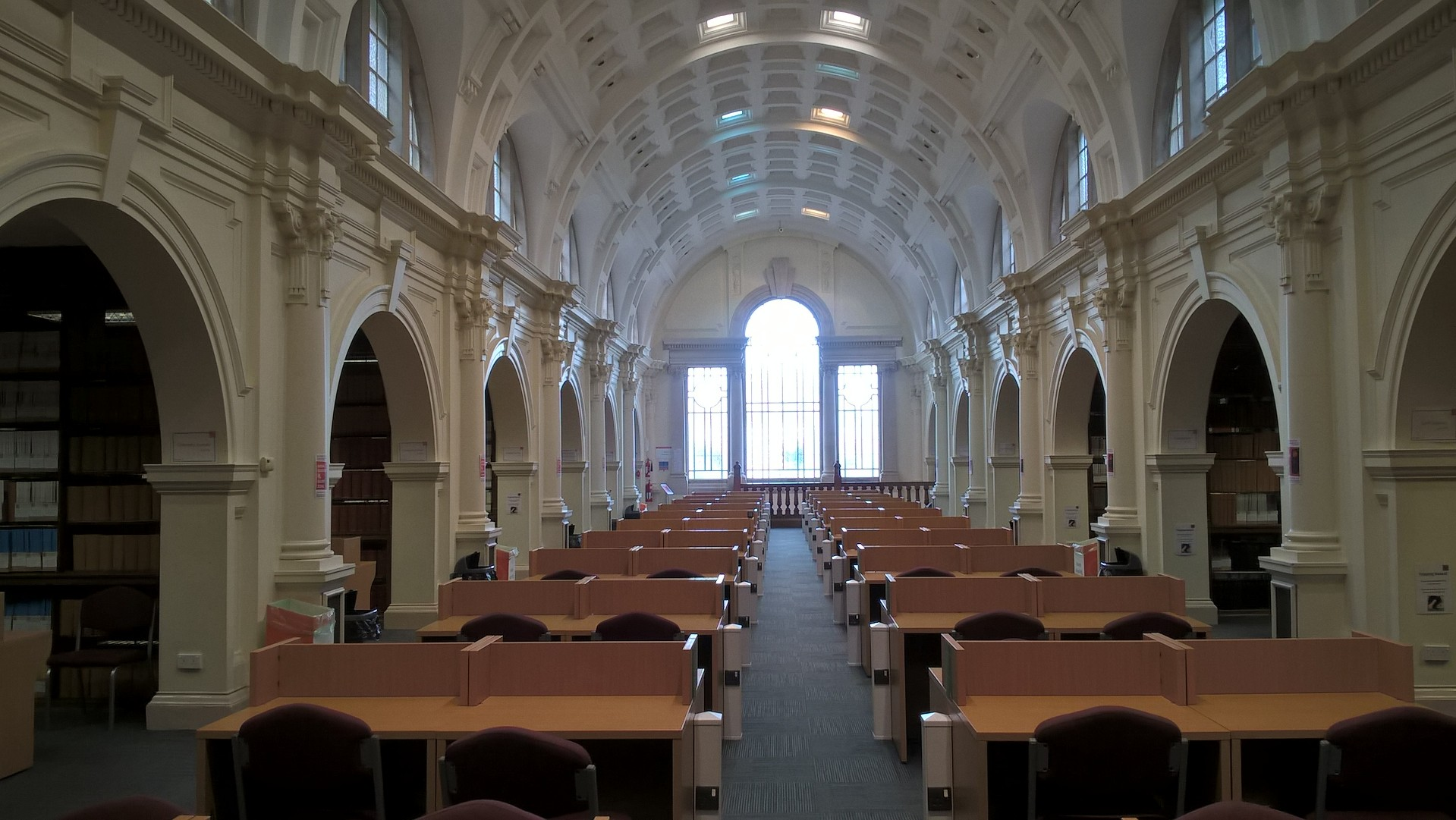
The main reading room of the Science Library, pictured in 2017

The university's academic facilities are centred around Cathays Park in central Cardiff, which contains the university's grade II* listed main building, housing administrative facilities and the science library, previously called the Drapers' library; the grade II listed Bute building, which contains the Welsh School of Architecture, the grade I listed Glamorgan building, which houses the Cardiff Schools of Planning and Geography and Social Sciences, the Redwood Building (named in 1979 after the Redwood Family of Boverton near Llantwit Major by a 1978 suggestion by J. D. R. Thomas), which houses the School of Pharmacy and Pharmaceutical Sciences; the law building which houses the Cardiff Law School; and the biosciences building, which provides facilities for both biosciences and medical teaching. The School of Engineering and School of Physics and Astronomy are located in the Queen's Buildings, off Newport Road, the Schools of Computer Science of Informatics and Mathematics at the Abacws Building, and the School of Journalism, Media and Culture at 2 Central Square.

A number of university academic facilities are located at the Heath Park campus, based at the University Hospital of Wales. This covers the Cardiff University School of Medicine, the School of Dentistry, and the School of Healthcare Sciences.

Buildings of Cardiff University
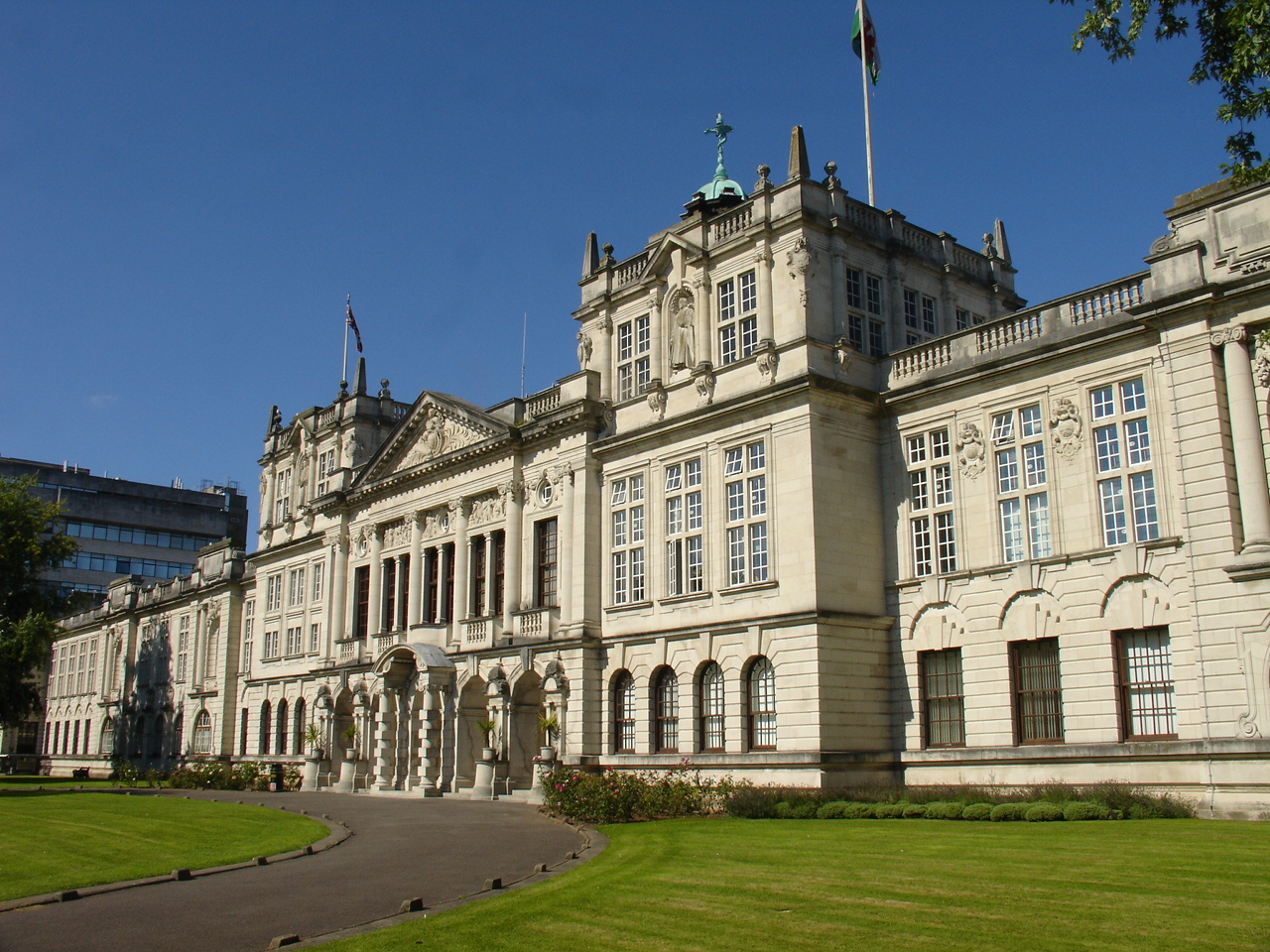
The Main Building – completed in 1909.

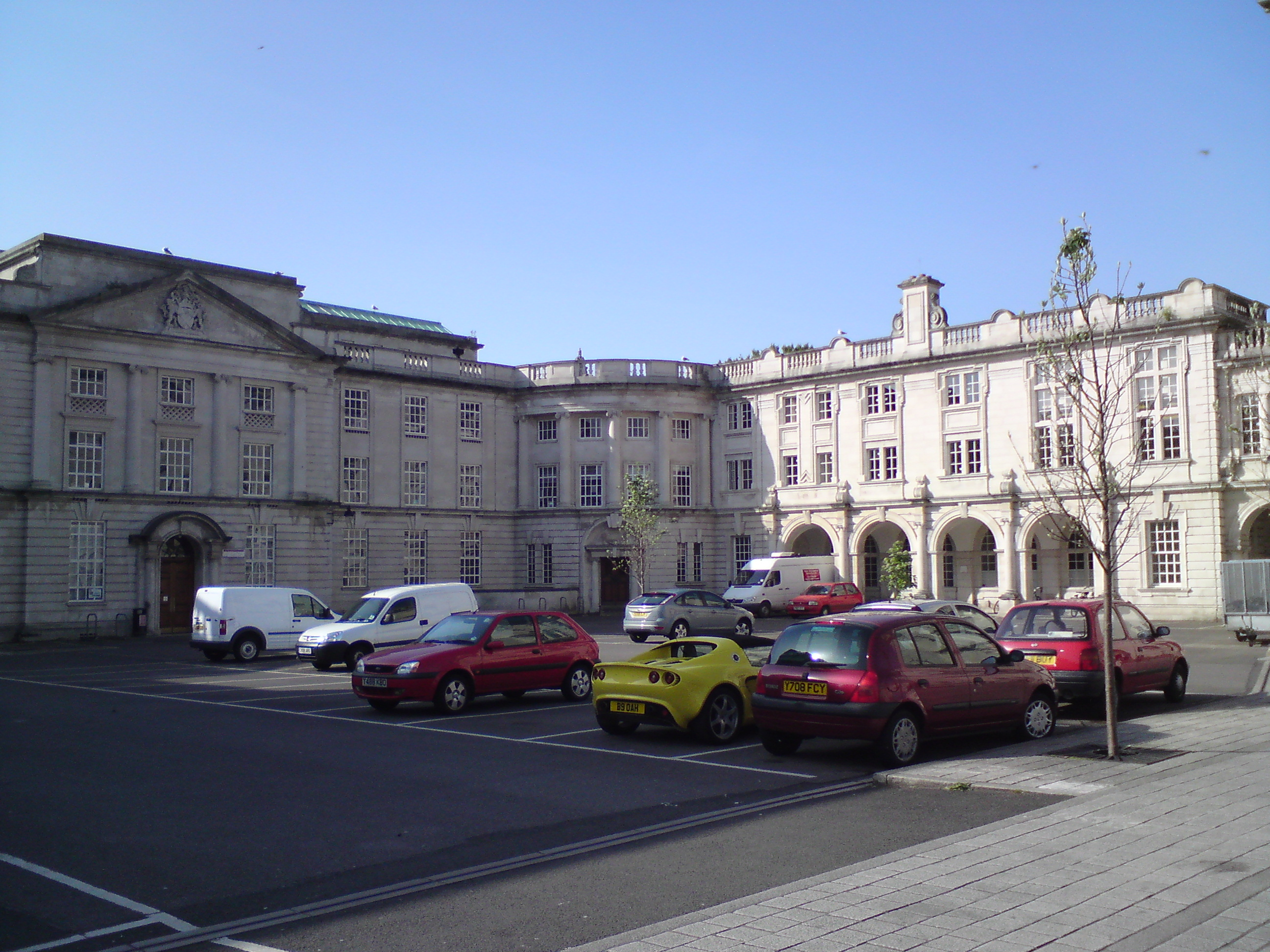
School of Chemistry

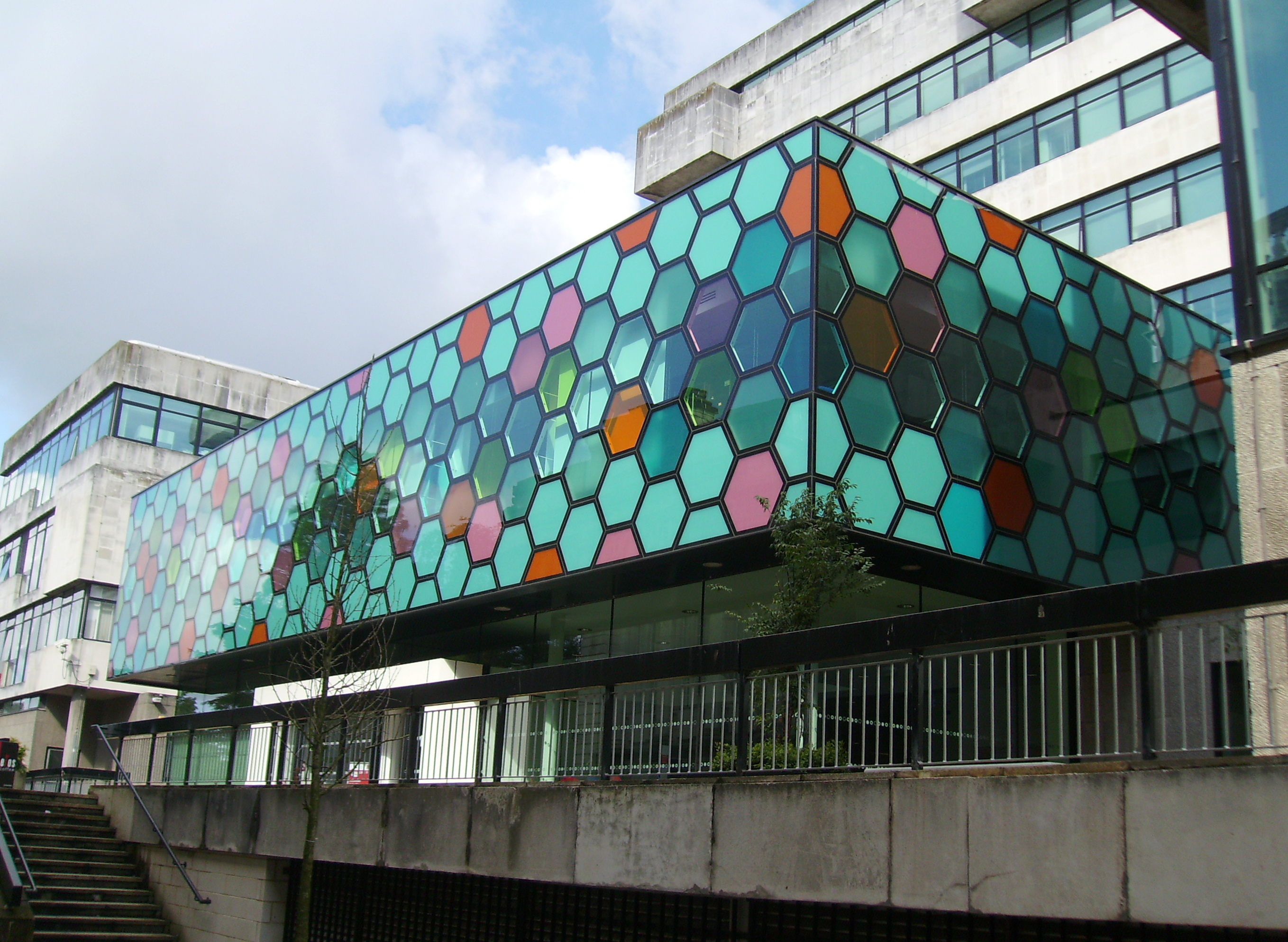
Sir Martin Evans Building, School of Biosciences

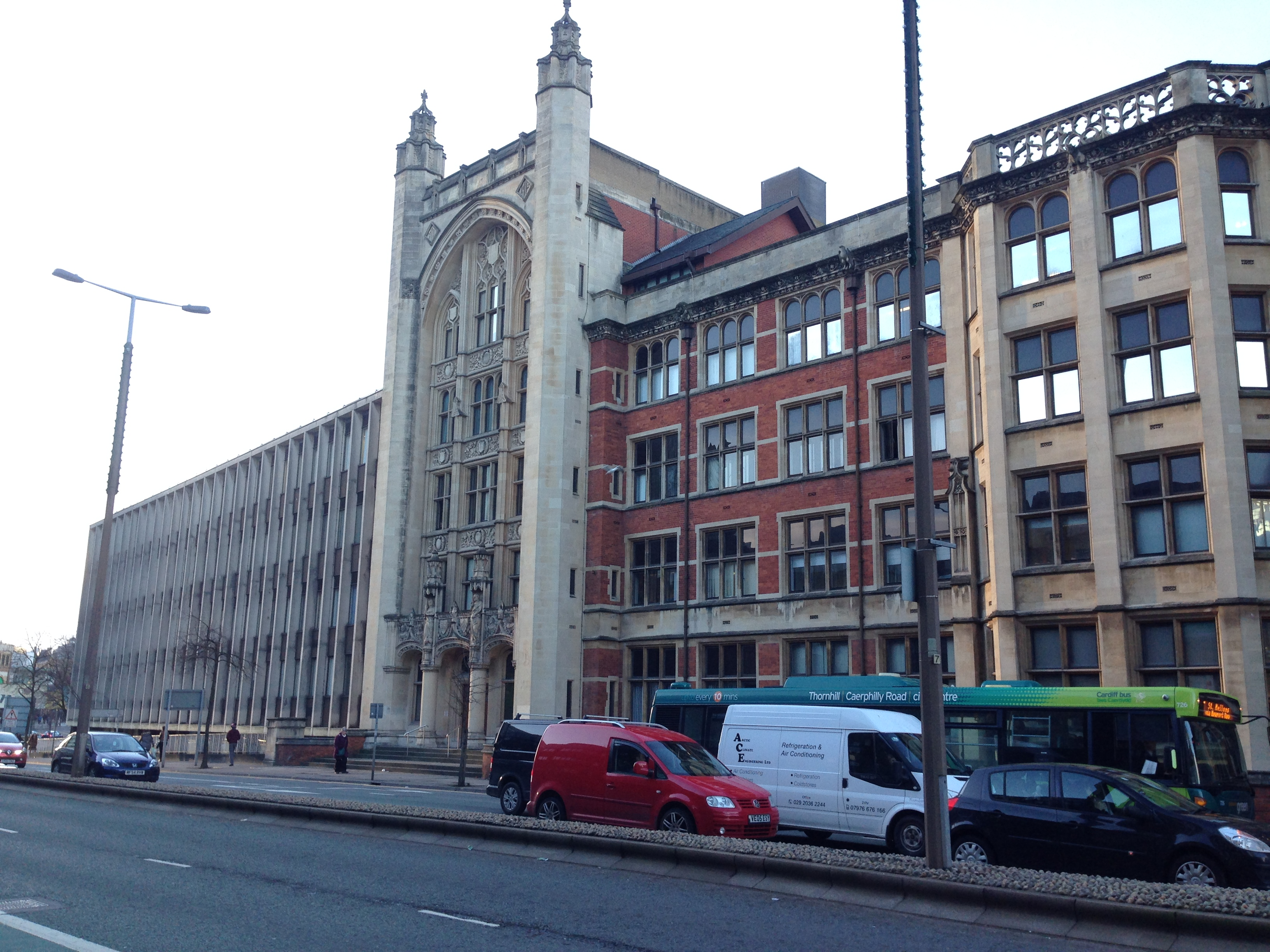
Cardiff School of Engineering

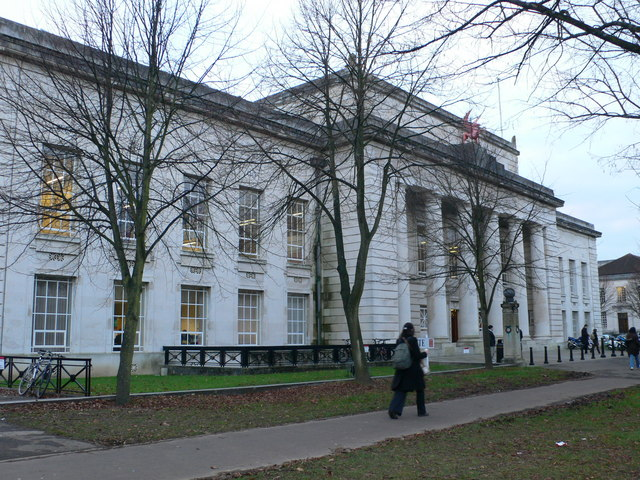
Bute Building

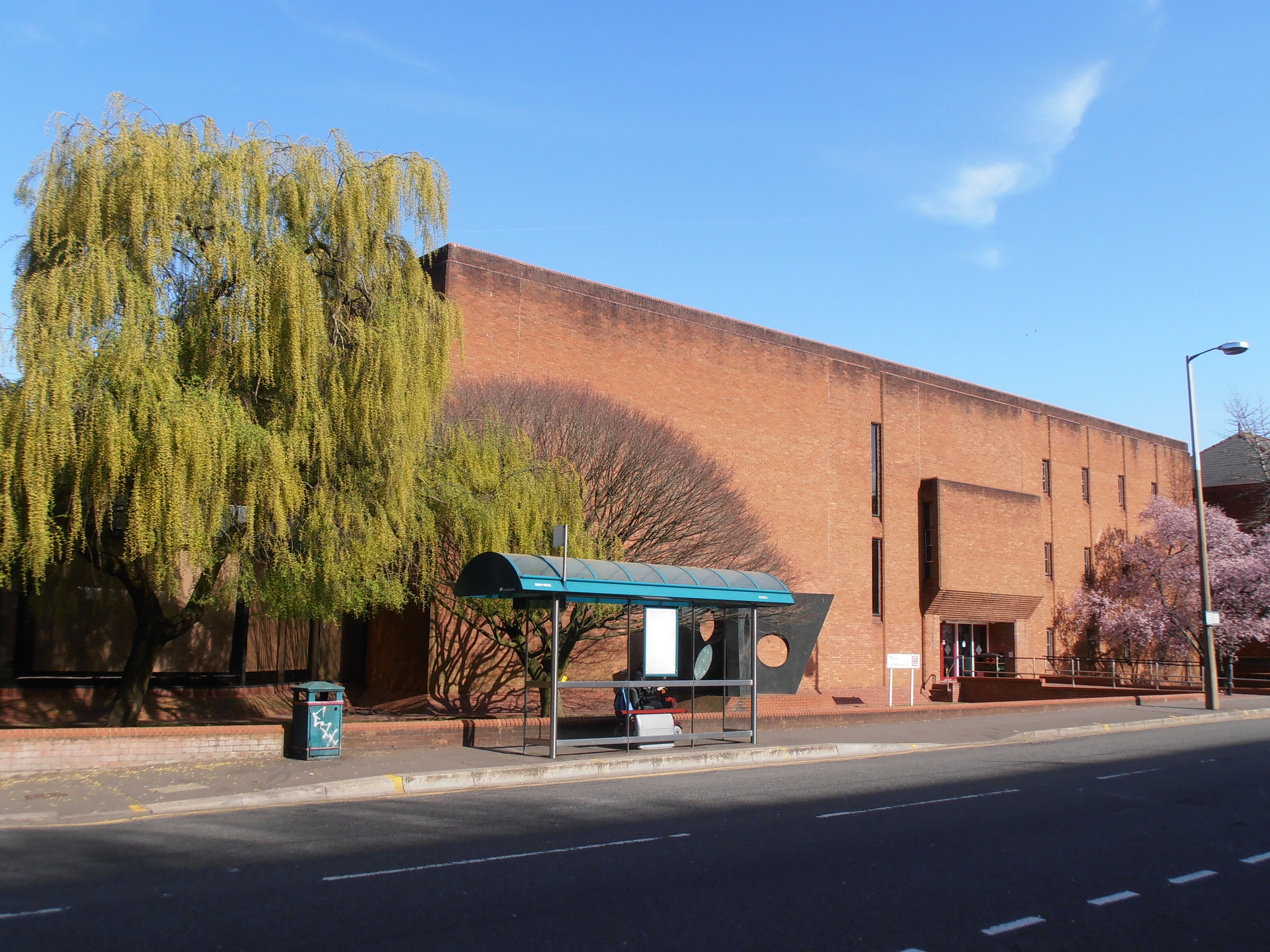
Cardiff University School of Music

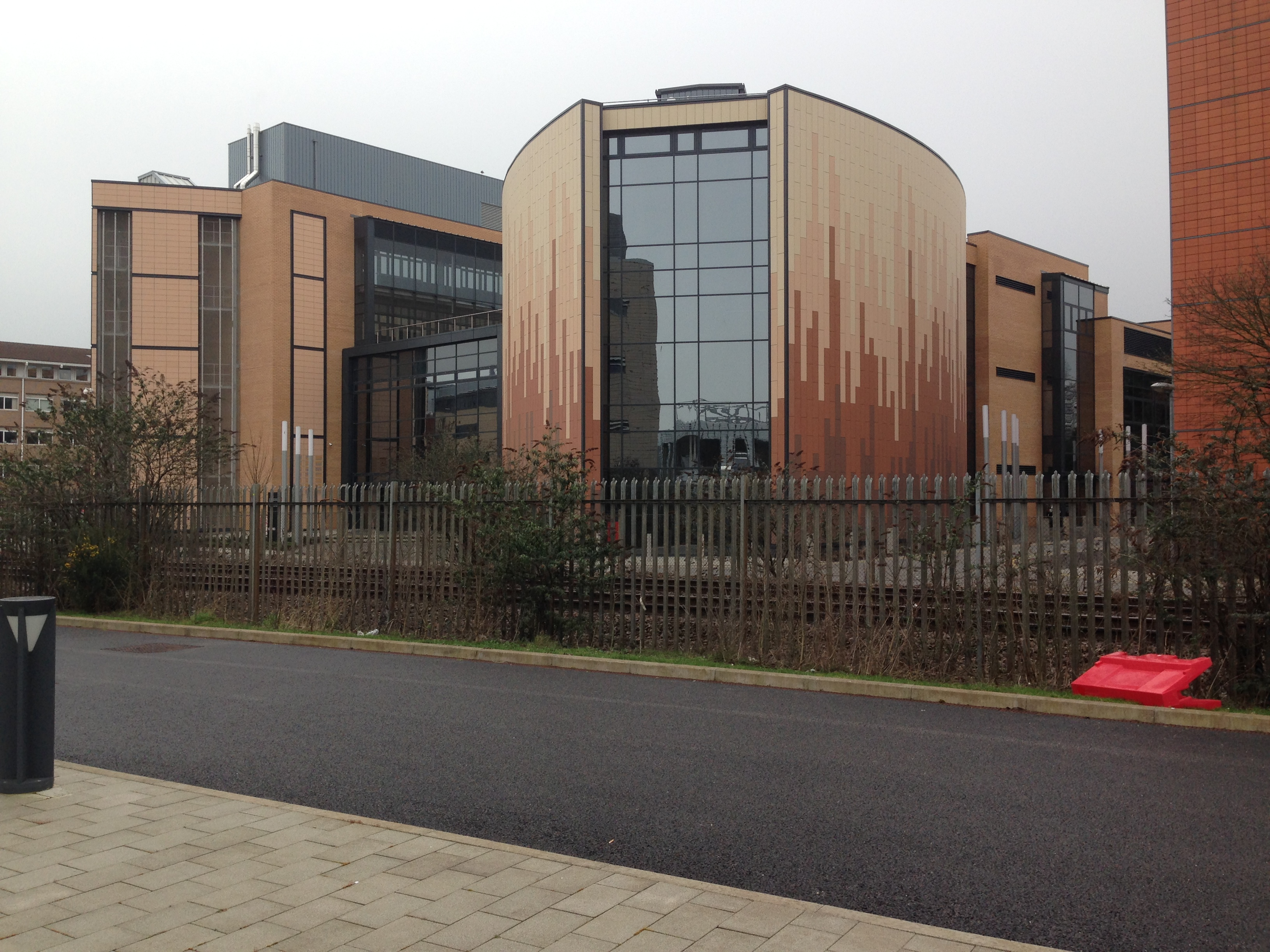
Cardiff Business School

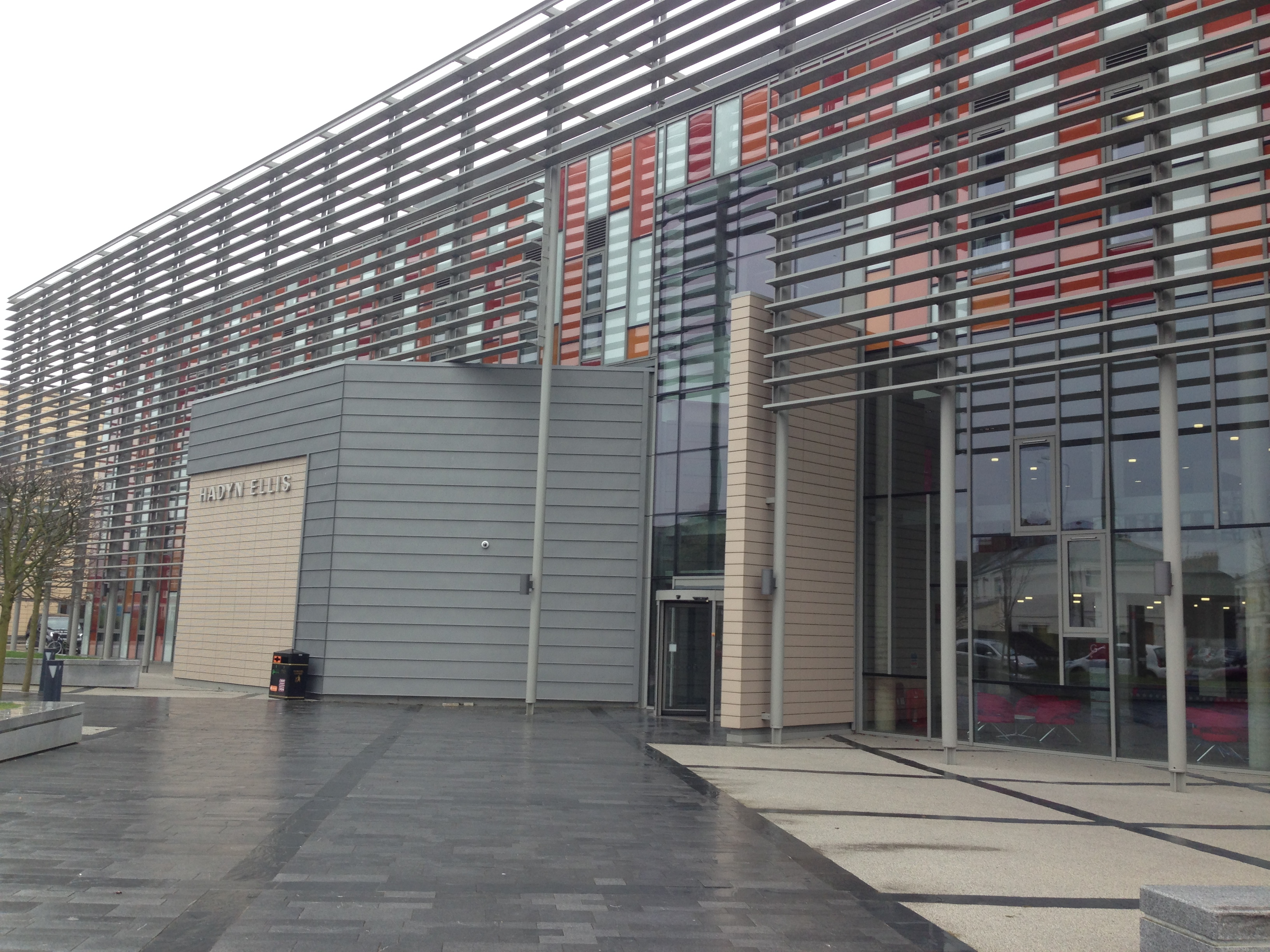
Hadyn Ellis Building

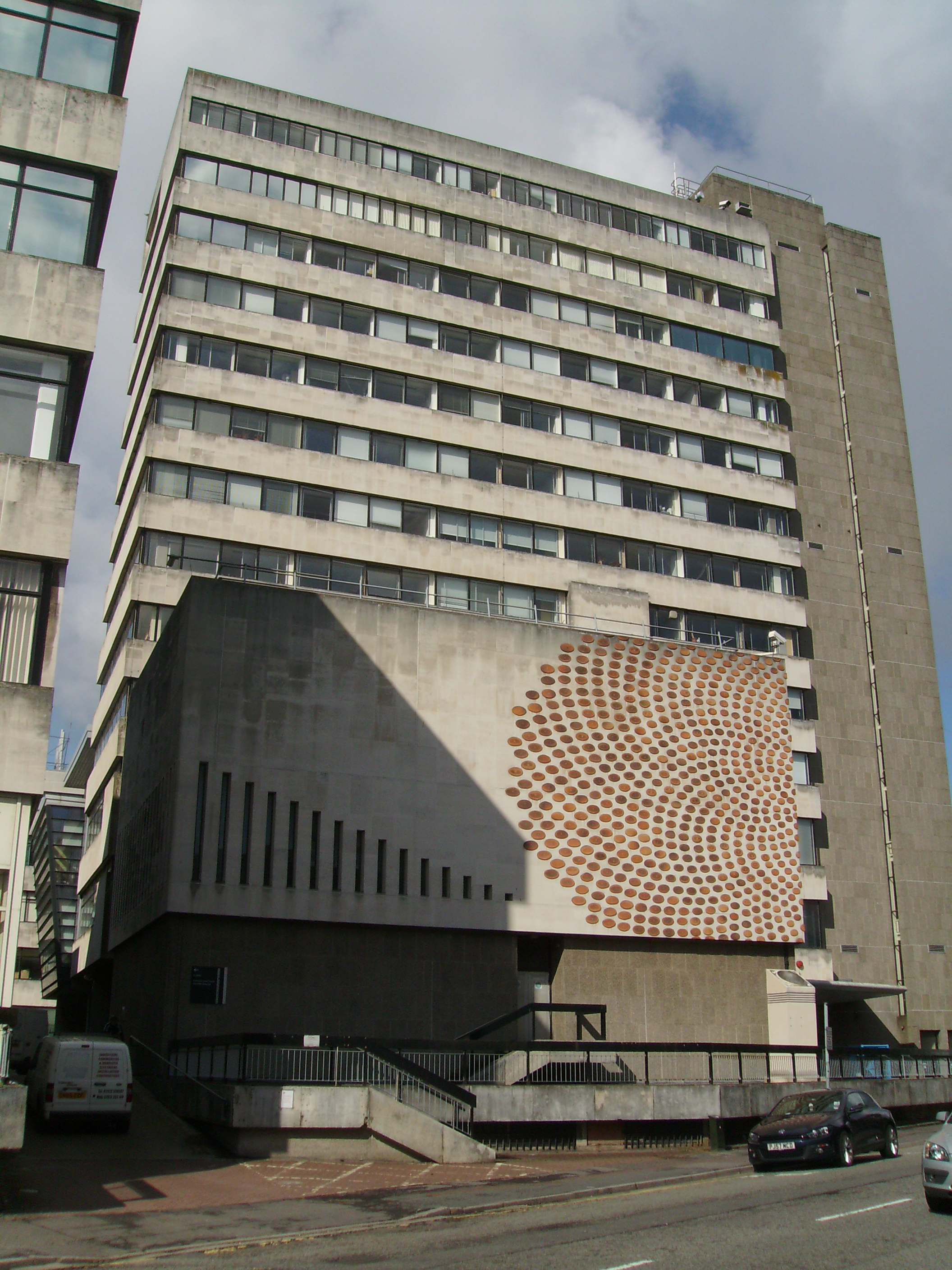
Psychology Tower Building

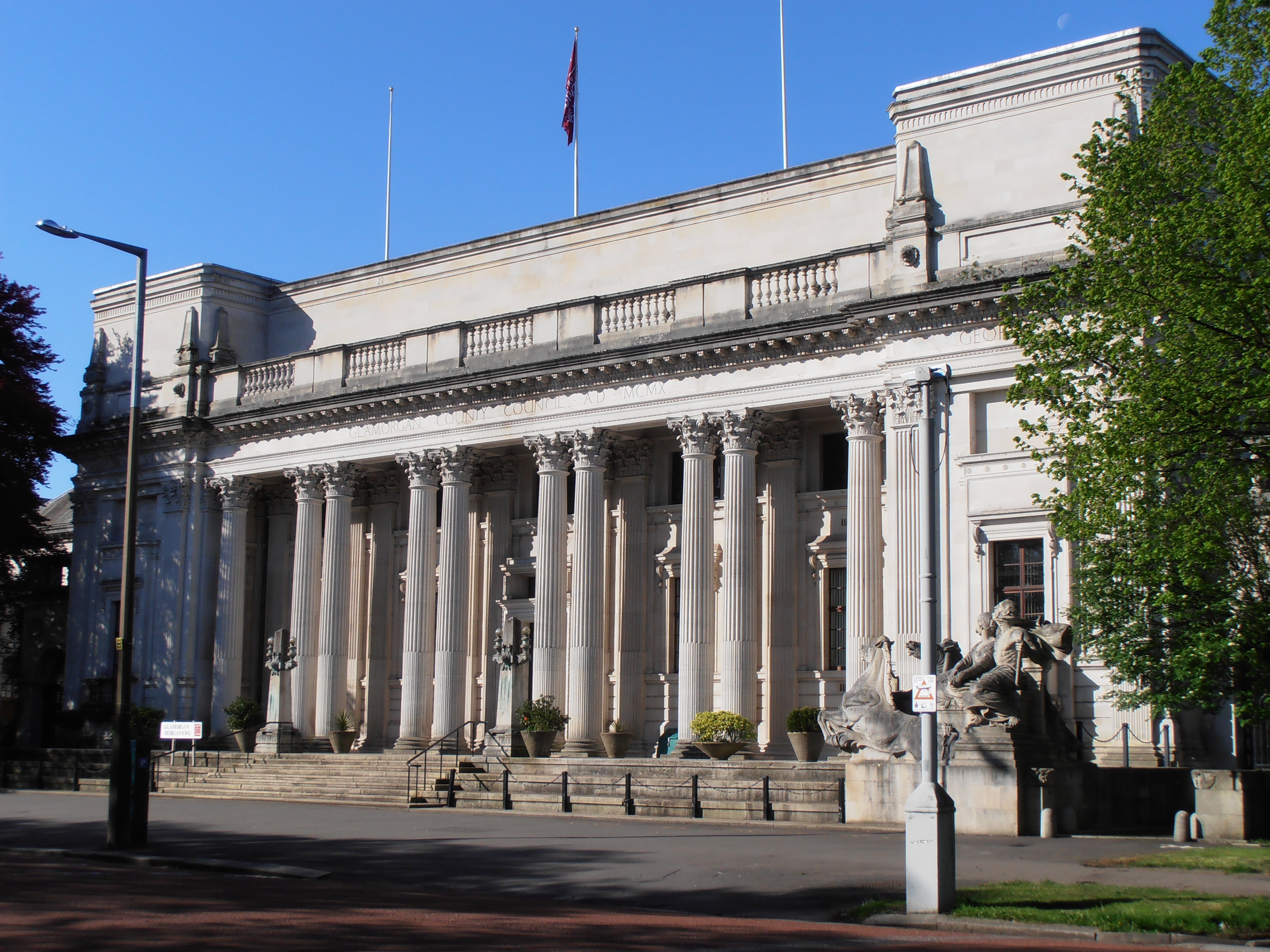
Glamorgan Building, School of Social Sciences

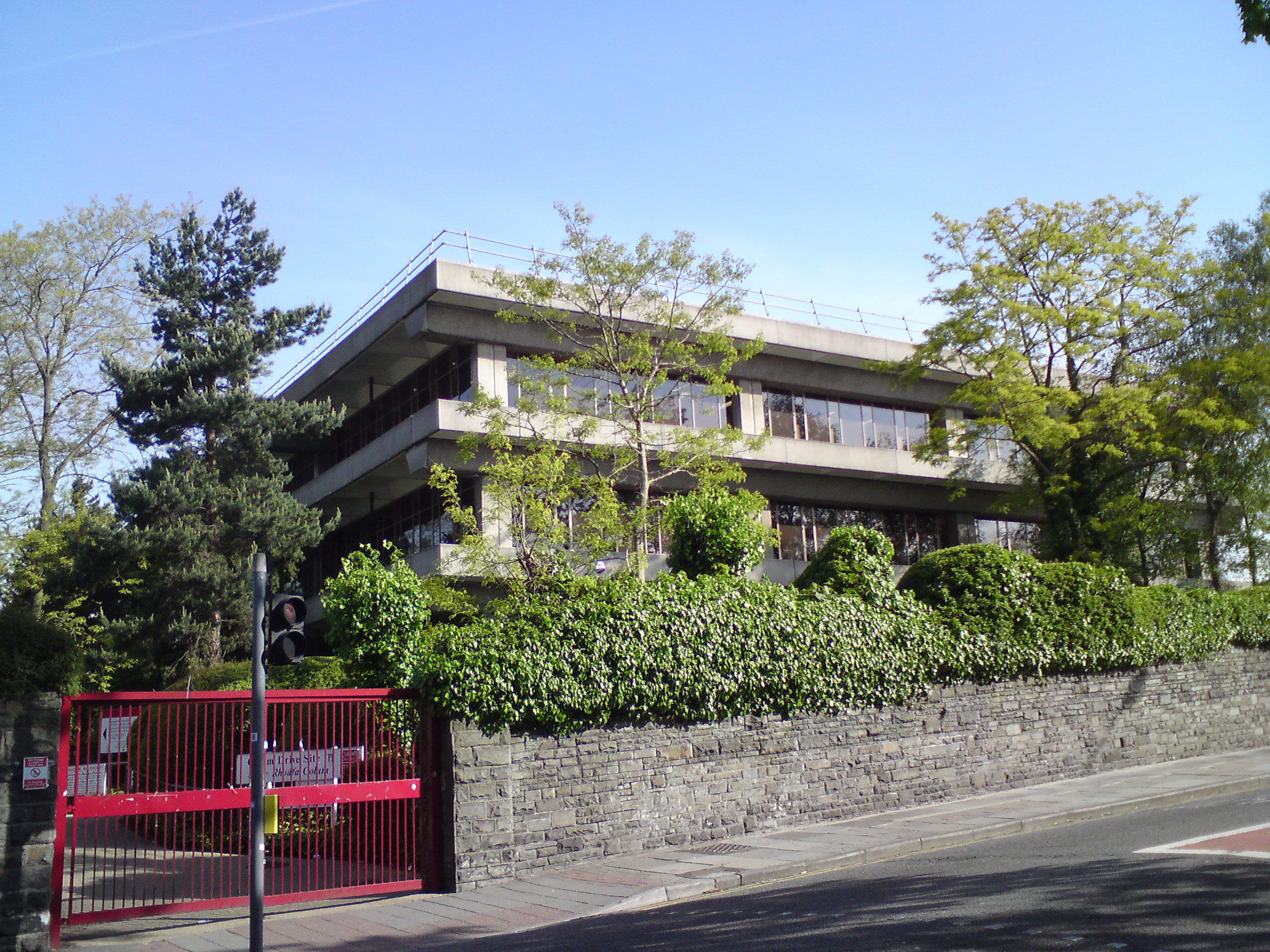
Arts and Social Sciences Library

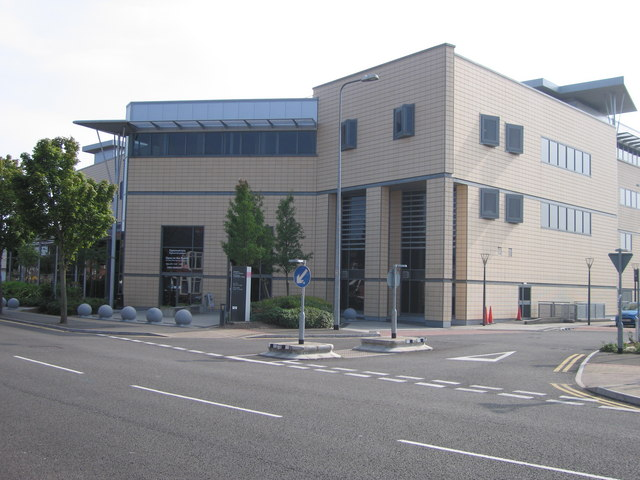
School of Optometry and Vision Sciences

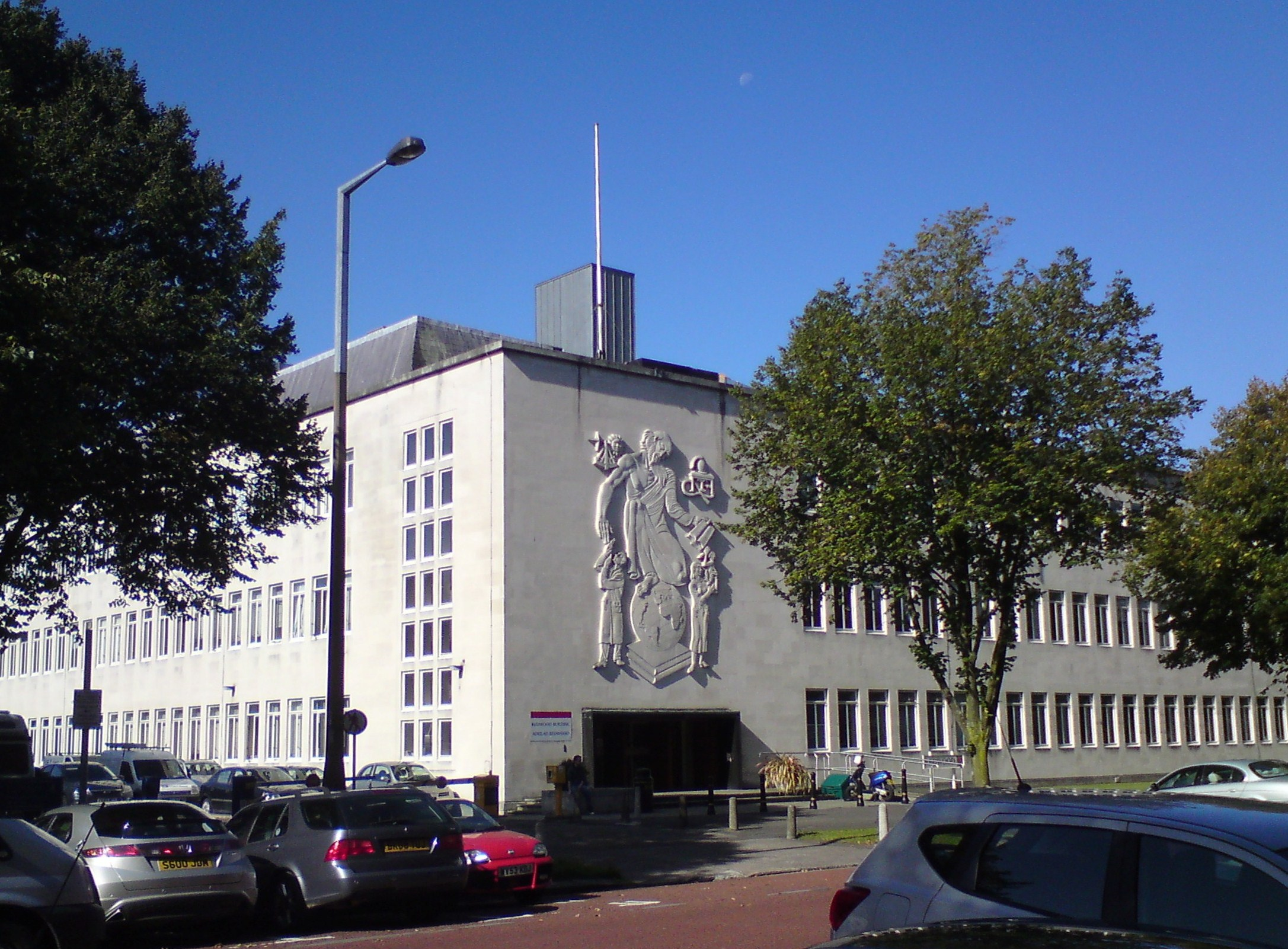
Redwood Building – School of Pharmacy and Pharmaceutical Sciences

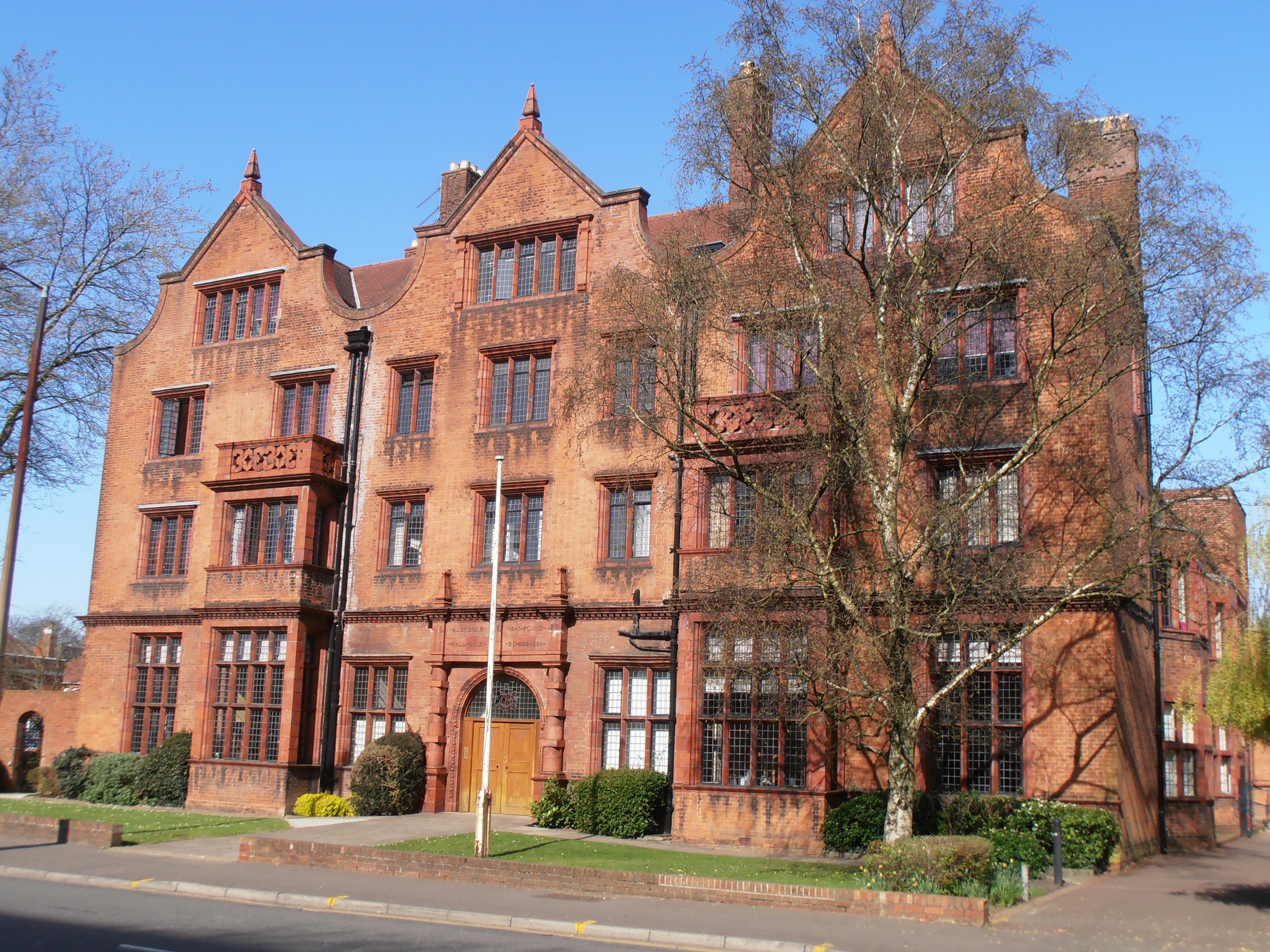
Aberdare Hall

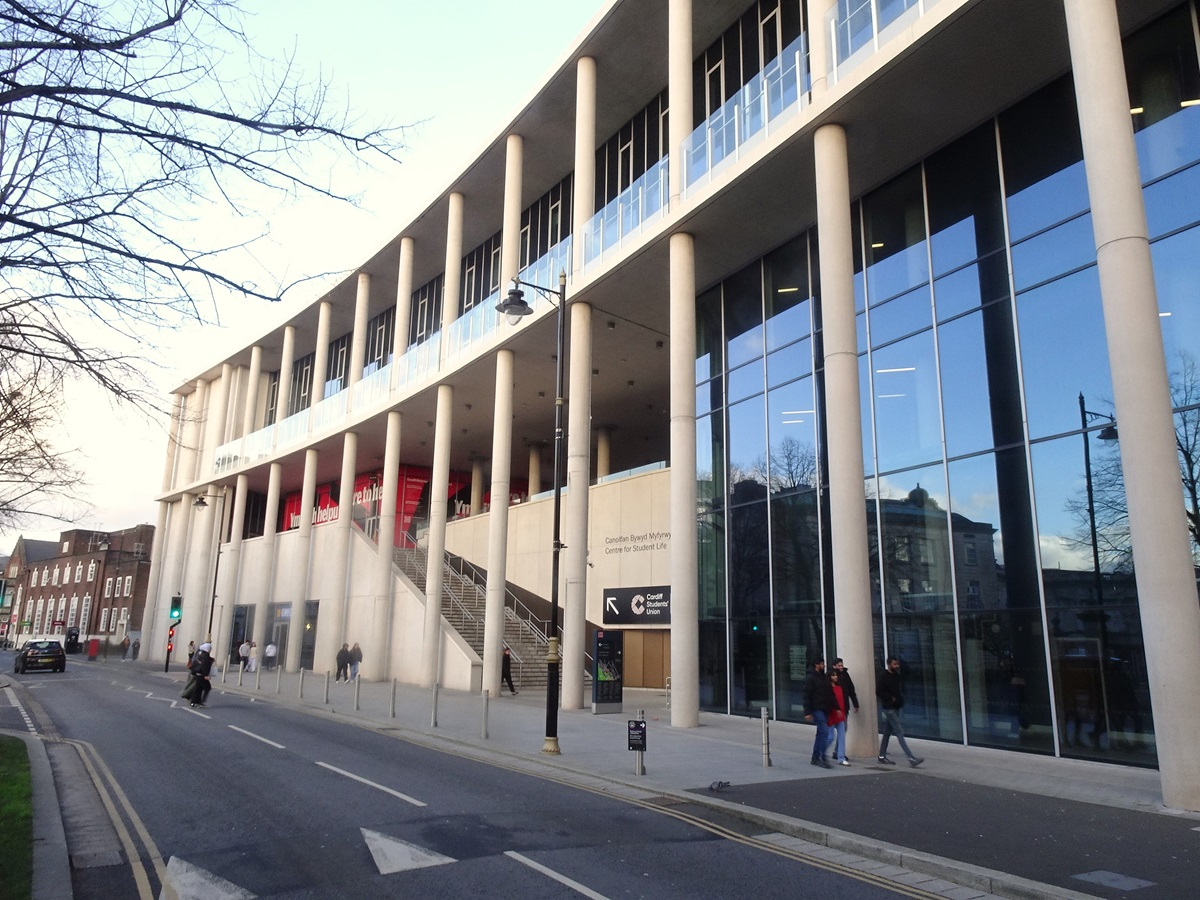
Exterior view of the Centre for Student Life from Park Place

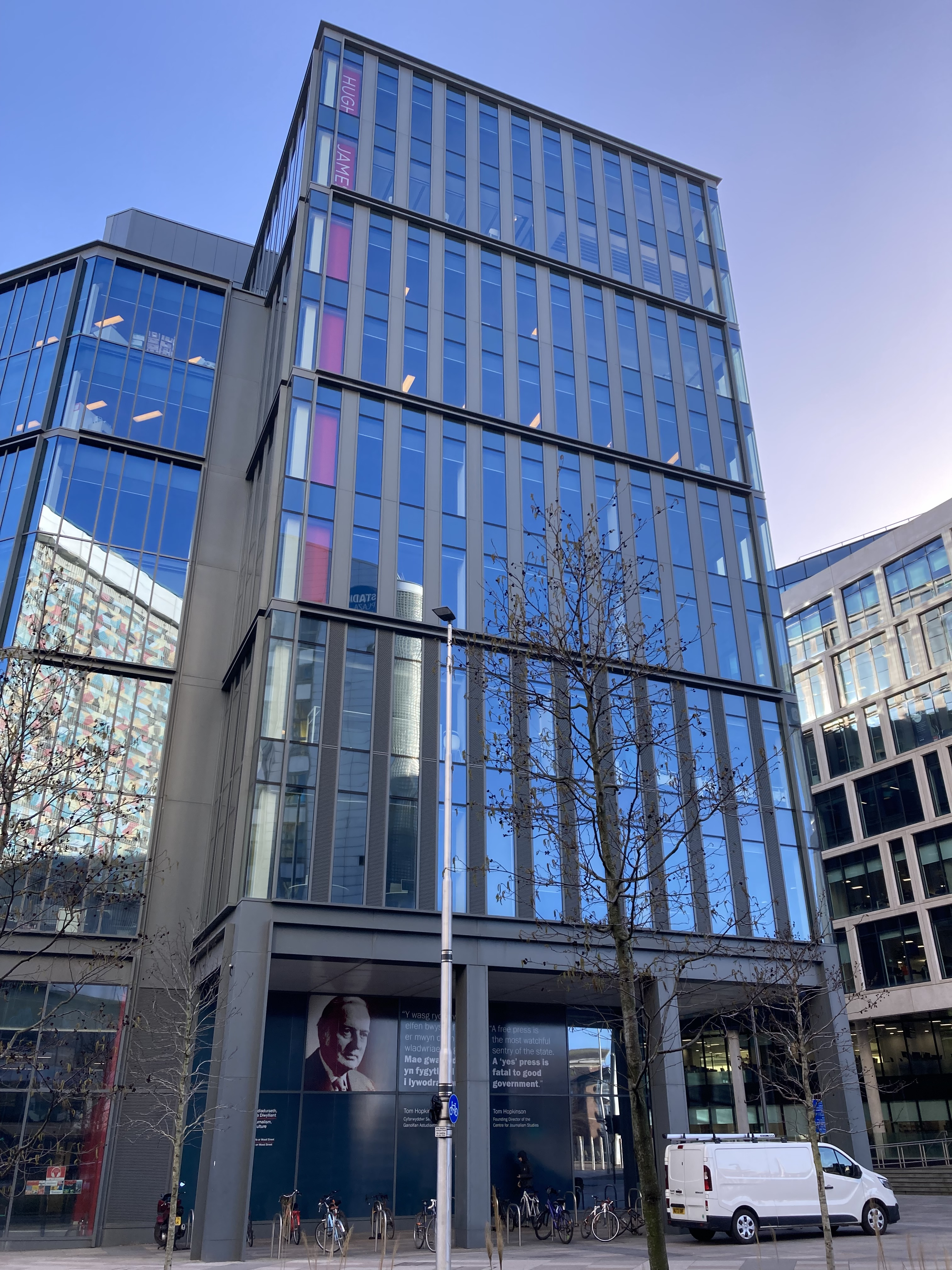
School of Journalism, Media and Culture

=== Athletics facilities ===
Most of the university's sports facilities are located at the sports training village in the Talybont Halls complex. This includes facilities for football, badminton, basketball, tennis, hockey and gym. Additional gym facilities and squash courts are located at the university fitness and squash centre, near the city centre campus at Cathays Park. Extensive playing fields for Rugby, football and lacrosse are located at the university playing fields near Llanrumney. The university also utilises the nearby Millennium Stadium for rugby fixtures such as the annual varsity tournament.

=== Student accommodation ===
The university maintains 15 student halls and a number of student houses throughout the city of Cardiff; providing a total of 5,362 student places in accommodation. They are in a variety of architectural styles and ages, from the Gothic Aberdare Hall, built in 1895, to the modern Talybont Gate Building, completed in 2014. All first-year students are guaranteed a place in university owned and managed halls. The Cardiff University Halls are:

- Aberconway Hall
- Aberdare Hall
- Cartwright Court
- Clodien House
- Colum Hall
- Hodge Hall
- Gordon Hall
- Roy Jenkins Hall
- Senghennydd Court
- Senghennydd Hall
- The Talybont 'Student Village' (Including Talybont North, South, Court and Gate Halls)
- University Hall
- Houses in Colum Road and Colum Place
- Student Village Houses

=== Kazakhstan ===
Cardiff University opened an international branch campus in Astana, the capital city of Kazakhstan, in September 2025. This offers four-year bachelor's degree programmes in business and STEM subjects, including a foundation year as standard.

== Organisation ==
=== Schools and colleges ===
The 26 academic schools of the university are divided into three colleges: Arts, Humanities and Social Sciences; Biomedical and Life Sciences; and Physical Sciences.

College of Arts, Humanities and Social Sciences

- Business
- English, Communication and Philosophy
- Geography and Planning
- History, Archaeology and Religion
- Journalism, Media and Cultural Studies
- Law and Politics
- Modern Languages
- Music
- Social Sciences
- Welsh

College of Biomedical and Life Sciences

- Biosciences
- Dentistry
- Healthcare Sciences
- Medicine
- Optometry and Vision Sciences
- Pharmacy and Pharmaceutical Sciences
- Postgraduate Medical and Dental Education (Wales Deanery)
- Psychology

College of Physical Sciences and Engineering

- Architecture
- Chemistry
- Computer Science & Informatics
- Earth and Environmental Sciences
- Engineering
- Mathematics
- Physics and Astronomy

Cardiff also has a Doctoral Academy, that brings together the work of four previous discipline-based Graduate Schools and the postgraduate research activity of the university's Graduate Centre.

=== Finances ===
In the financial year ending 31 July 2024, Cardiff had a total income of £638 million (2022/23 – £627.2 million) and total expenditure of £500.4 million (2022/23 – £603 million). Key sources of income included £328.3 million from tuition fees and education contracts (2022/23 – £310.6 million), £83.2 million from funding body grants (2022/23 – £90.2 million), £126.6 million from research grants and contracts (2022/23 – £133.6 million), £11.5 million from investment income (2022/23 – £9.6 million) and £4.5 million from donations and endowments (2022/23 – £1.4 million).

At year end, Cardiff had endowments of £53.1 million (2023 – £46.2 million) and total net assets of £852.6 million (2023 – £679 million).

== Academic profile ==
=== Rankings and reputation ===
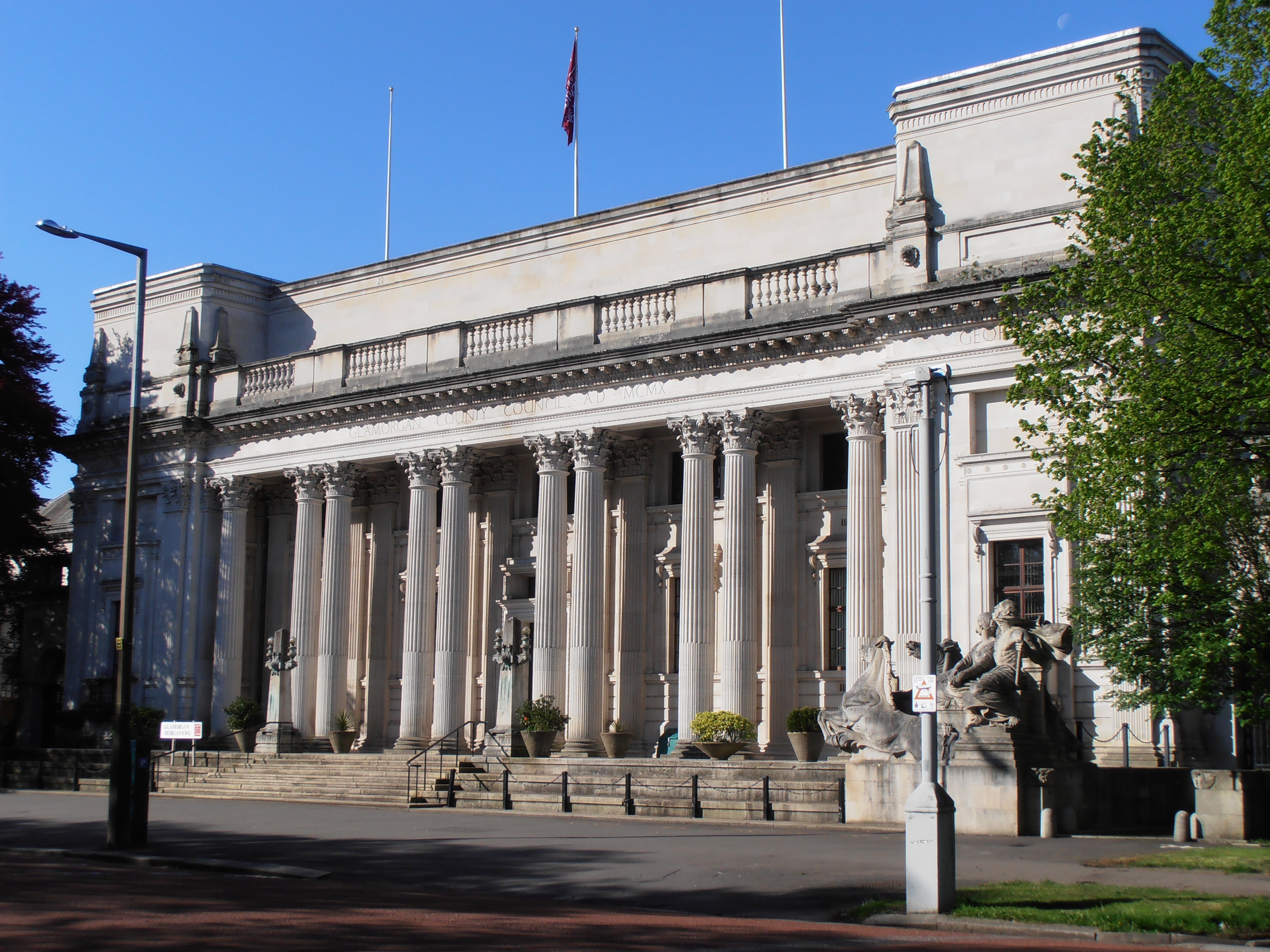
Glamorgan Building

Rankings
National rankings
- Complete (2027): 27=
- Guardian (2027): 43
- Times / Sunday Times (2027): 32

Global rankings
- ARWU (2026): 201–300
- QS (2027): 179=
- THE (2026): 201–250

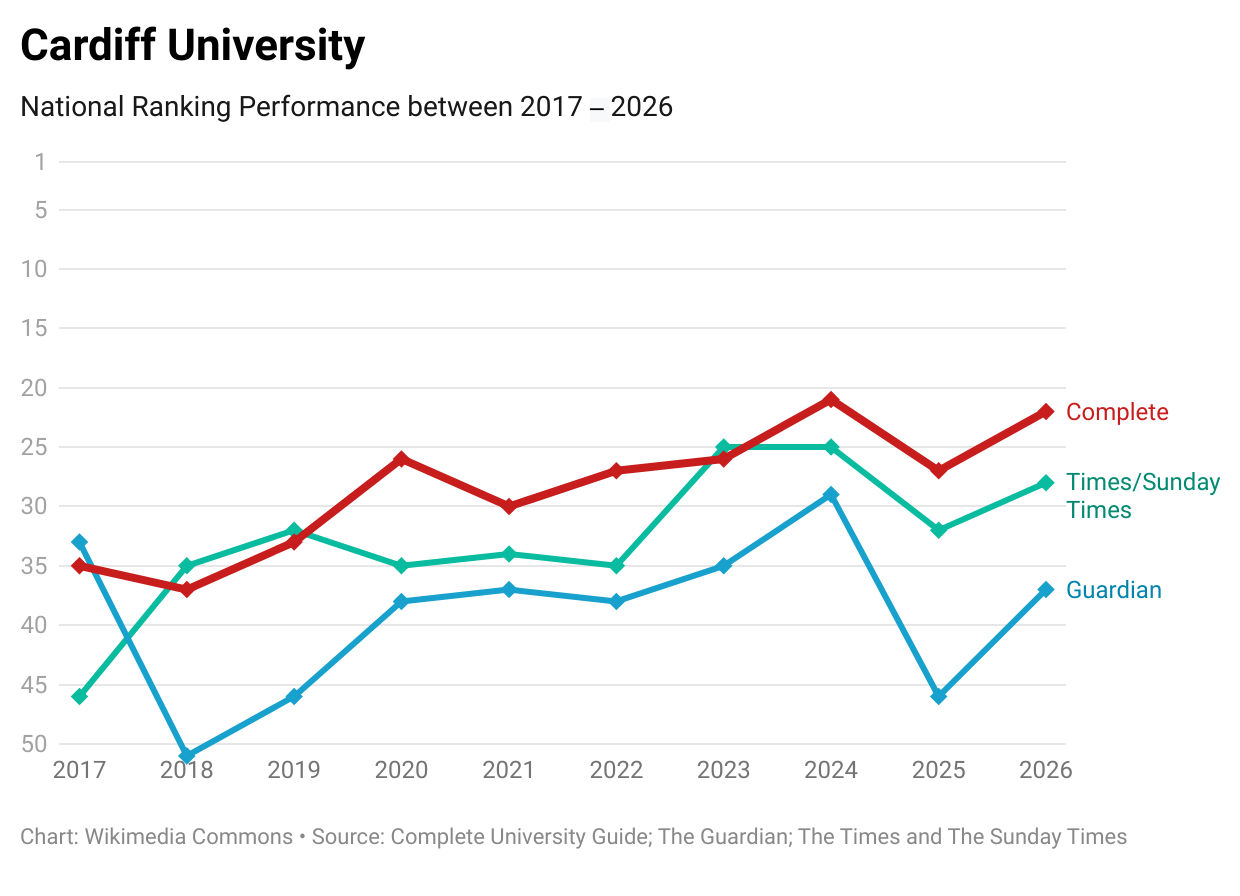
Cardiff University's national league table performance over the past ten years

Cardiff University is a highly renowned for several subjects in its department. Cardiff has produced two Nobel Laureates on its staff, Sir Martin Evans and Robert Huber. A number of Cardiff University staff have been elected as Fellows of the Royal Society, these include Graham Hutchings FRS, professor of Physical Chemistry and Director of the Cardiff Catalysis Institute, School of Chemistry, Ole Holger Petersen, MRC Professor and Director of Cardiff School of Biosciences. and John M. Pearce, Professor of Psychology.

In 2013, Cardiff University was ranked as one of the best UK universities for supporting LGBT students, by the charity Stonewall in its annual Gay by Degree guide. The university was one of only two in the UK and the only one in Wales to achieve top marks in a Stonewall checklist of priorities for LGBT+ students.

Cardiff University was ranked joint 168th in Best Global Universities by US News in 2021. It was ranked 164th among universities around the world by SCImago Institutions Rankings in 2021. The Round University Rankings ranked Cardiff University 162nd globally in 2021. The Center for World University Rankings listed Cardiff University 159th in the world in 2021.

According to QS World University Rankings by Subject in 2021, Cardiff University ranked within the world's top 50 universities in communication and media studies (28), in Architecture and Built environment (37) and Psychology (59). Other subjects ranked within the top 100 are dentistry, and mineral and mining engineering (49) civil and structural engineering, geography, social policy and administration, pharmacy and pharmacology, English language and literature, and sociology.

=== Admissions ===
UCAS Admission Statistics
	2025	2024	2023	2022	2021
Applications (Note: Main scheme applications, International and UK)	45,735	46,240	46,355	46,345	44,155
Accepted Offers	7,405	8,025	7,875	7,375	7,915
Applications/Accepted Ratio	6.2	5.8	5.9	6.3	5.6
Overall Offer Rate (%)	72.5	71.9	69.9	68.1	70.5
↳ UK only (%) (Note: UK domiciled applicants)	74.4	73.5	71.0	68.4	70.4
Average Entry Tariff	—N/a	—N/a	144	152	153
↳ Top three exams (Note: The maximum tariff score for three exams is 168: the equivalent of A*A*A* at A-Level, 777 at HL for the IB Diploma Programme, or AAA at Advanced Higher)	—N/a	—N/a	135.4	141.1	139.4

HESA Student Body Composition (2024/25)
Domicile and Ethnicity	Total
British White (Note: Not be confused solely with White British)	64%
British Ethnic Minorities (Note: Includes those who indicate that they identify as Asian, Black, Mixed Heritage, Arab or any other ethnicity except White.)	20%
International EU	1%
International Non-EU	15%
Undergraduate Widening Participation Indicators
Female	59%
Independent School	14%
Low Participation Areas (Note: Calculated from the Polar4 measure, using Quintile1, in England and Wales. Calculated from the Scottish Index of Multiple Deprivation (SIMD) measure, using SIMD20, in Scotland.)	10%

In the 2024/25 academic year, the student body consisted of 31,505 students, composed of 24,645 undergraduates and 6,860 postgraduate students. The university is designated as a 'high-tariff' institution by the Department for Education, with the average undergraduate entrant to the university in recent years amassing between 135–141 UCAS Tariff points in their top three pre-university qualifications – the equivalent of ABB to AAA at A-Level. Based on 2022/23 HESA entry standards data published in domestic league tables, which include a broad range of qualifications beyond the top three exam grades, the average student at Cardiff University achieved 152 points.

According to the 2017 Times and Sunday Times Good University Guide, approximately 15 per cent of Cardiff's undergraduates come from independent schools. In the 2016–2017 academic year, the university had a domicile breakdown of 76:5:19 of UK:EU:non-EU students respectively with a female to male ratio of 59:41.

== Student life ==
=== Students' Union ===
The Cardiff University Students' Union is a student-run organisation aiming to promote student interests within the university and further afield. The Cardiff University Students' Union building is near Cathays Park, next to Cathays railway station. It has shops, a night club and the studios of Xpress Radio and Gair Rhydd, the student newspaper. It is democratically controlled by the student body through the election of seven full-time officers, who manage the running of the Union. The Union provides a range of services, including a number of cafes, bars and shops, as well as advice, training and representation. The Union is an affiliated member of the National Union of Students.

==== Groups and societies ====
The students' union supports over 200 societies across a wide range of interests as well as 70 sports clubs through the athletic union.

==== Media ====
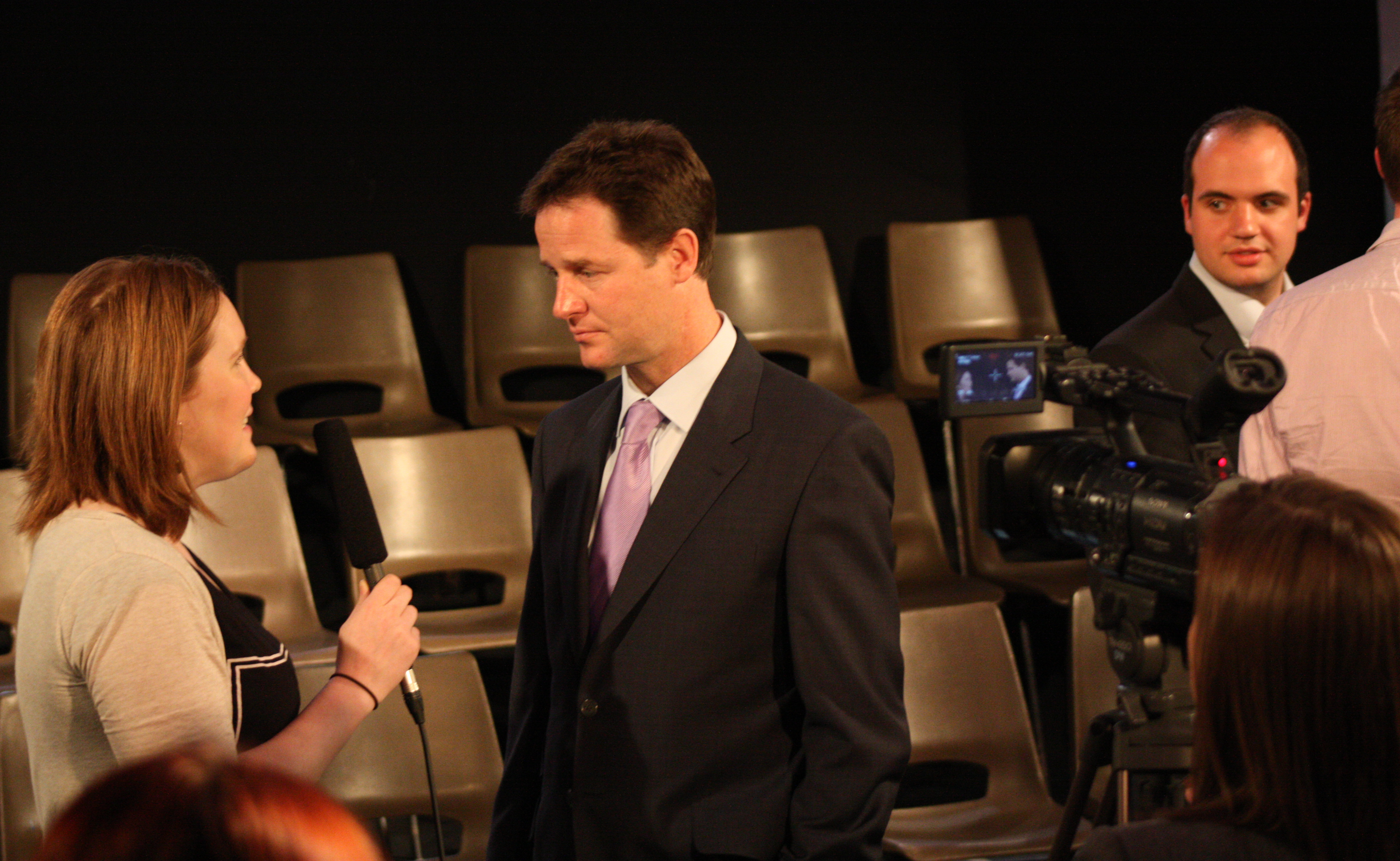
Nick Clegg at Cardiff University Students' Union conducting an interview with CUTV in 2010

The Union provides facilities and support for several student media groups, including: Gair Rhydd, an award-winning, free student newspaper that is released every Monday of term; Quench, a monthly arts and lifestyle magazine that specialises in the local music scene as well as original investigative feature articles; and CUTV, the student television channel.

Xpress Radio is the student radio station. It broadcasts daily during term from studios in the Students' Union building, with programming such as comedy panel shows, new music showcases, local music showcases, and film reviews.

=== Student activism ===
Student activism at Cardiff University has included protests about the university's investments in arms companies in 2009, as part of a larger student movement in the UK at that time, and participating in the 2024 pro-Palestinian protests on university campuses. An encampment was established outside the Cardiff University Main Building on 14 May 2024 by students from Cardiff University, Cardiff Metropolitan University, the University of South Wales and the Royal Welsh College of Music and Drama, joining the Cymru Students For Palestine umbrella group that also included protestors at Swansea University and Bangor University. The encampment dispersed on 17 July 2024 after the university confirmed that it already met some demands and committed to address some of the others.

The following year, in May 2025, Cardiff University Students' Union released a statement acknowledging a new pro-Palestinian encampment on campus. The encampment was served with an eviction notice by the university on 30 May, which stated that the encampment had caused "distress and disruption" by blocking the entrances to the main building, occupying rooms in the Glamorgan Building and accessing the roof, and inviting people from outside of the university to join events. The university was also granted precautionary injunctive relief for a year to prevent occupation of fourteen university buildings. The university stated that this action "could be interpreted as curtailing the right to protest and freedom of speech, but this is not the case. ... This decision is about ensuring the safety of everyone in our University community". Caerdydd Students for Palestine responded that "Cardiff University would rather violently repress its students than speak to us. Whilst we are outraged by this, we must remember the privilege of having a campus to protest on at all." According to The Guardian and the investigative journalism unit at the Liberty advocacy group, British Law firm Shakespeare Martineau LLP coached Cardiff University and several other universities on how to obtain these court orders.

=== Athletics ===
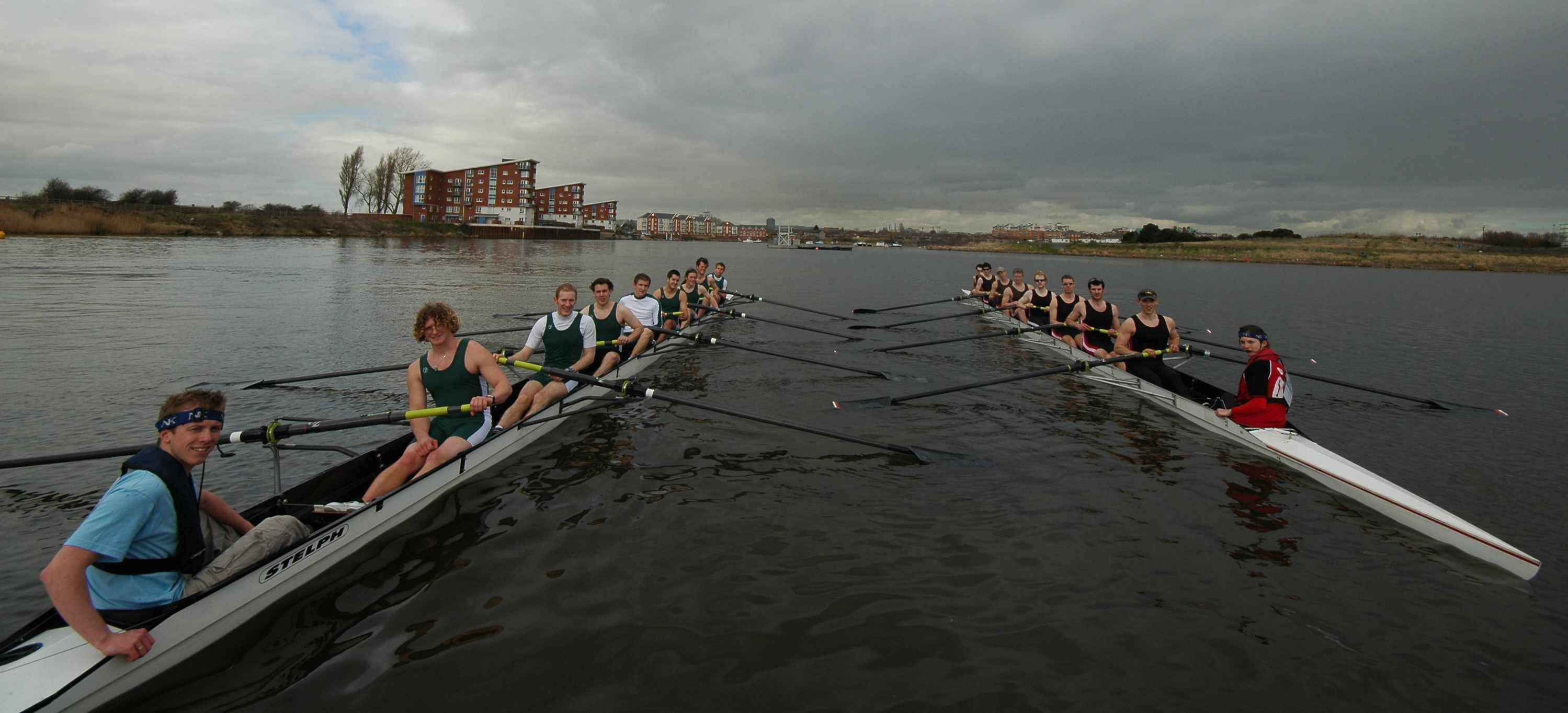
Swansea and Cardiff Universities Men's Senior eights during The Welsh Boat Race in 2006

The Cardiff University Athletic Union is the body that supports student sport at Cardiff, it oversees more than 60 competitive and non-competitive sports clubs, many of which compete in the British Universities and Colleges Sport league. The university's Ice Hockey team, the Cardiff Redhawks (which also recruits players from other Welsh universities) competes in the British Universities Ice Hockey Association leagues.

The university's sports teams also take part in the annual Welsh Varsity against Swansea University, which includes the Welsh Boat Race, and several other sporting competitions. The Welsh Varsity rugby match has been described as "probably... the second biggest Varsity Game next to Oxford vs Cambridge".

Cardiff participates in British Universities and Colleges Sport which manages a sporting framework of competitive fixtures and events for over 150 institutions around the UK. Cardiff registers nearly 100 teams in the various leagues and competitions each year and sees students travelling around the country to represent Cardiff University. In 2013 Cardiff team achieved 15th position overall across the 50 different sports hosting events.

== Insignia and other representations ==
=== Motto ===
Cardiff University's motto is Gwirionedd, Undod a Chytgord. The Welsh motto translates as Truth, Unity and Concord or Truth, Unity and Harmony. It is taken from the prayer for the Church militant as it appears in the 1662 Book of Common Prayer.

=== Coat of arms ===
Coat of arms of Cardiff University

Crest
A Dragon affronty wings expanded Gules the dexter wing charged with a crescent and the sinister with an embattled annulet both Gold.
Escutcheon
Gules three Chevrons and in chief an open Book of bound Argent the dexter page charged with a crescent and the sinister with an embattled Annulet both Gules all within a bordure Argent.
Supporters
On the dexter side an Angel proper habited Argent sandalled winged and crined Gold and on the other sinister side a dragon Gules.
Motto
Gwirionedd, Undod A Chytgord (Truth, unity and concord)
Badge
Two dragons wings conjoined Gules interlaced by a crescent Gold.

Cardiff University's current coat of arms was granted by the College of Arms in 1988 following the merger of University College Cardiff and the University of Wales Institute of Science and Technology. The coat of arms incorporates features from the heraldry of both former institutions. The three chevrons are derived from the arms of the de Clare lords of Glamorgan. The open book signifies learning; on it are the crescent and annulet, marks of cadence that indicate that University College Cardiff was the second of the University of Wales' institutions, and that the University of Wales Institute of Science and Technology was the fifth.

A notable feature of the arms are the supporters, which in heraldry are rarely granted to universities. The supporters are an angel from University College Cardiff and a Welsh Dragon from the University of Wales Institute of Science and Technology. The crest is a Welsh dragon in the stance of a lion; it stands on the helmet. Both the dragon and the helmet are distinguished by being front-facing rather than in profile as is more usually found in Welsh heraldry.

== Notable alumni and academics ==
=== Heads of state and government ===
- Barham Salih, President of Iraq, former prime minister of the Iraqi Kurdistan Region and former deputy prime minister of the Iraqi federal government
- Faisal Al-Fayez, Prime Minister of Jordan
- Mark Drakeford, First Minister of Wales
- Vaughan Gething, First Minister of Wales
- Rhun ap Iorwerth, First Minister of Wales

=== Politics ===
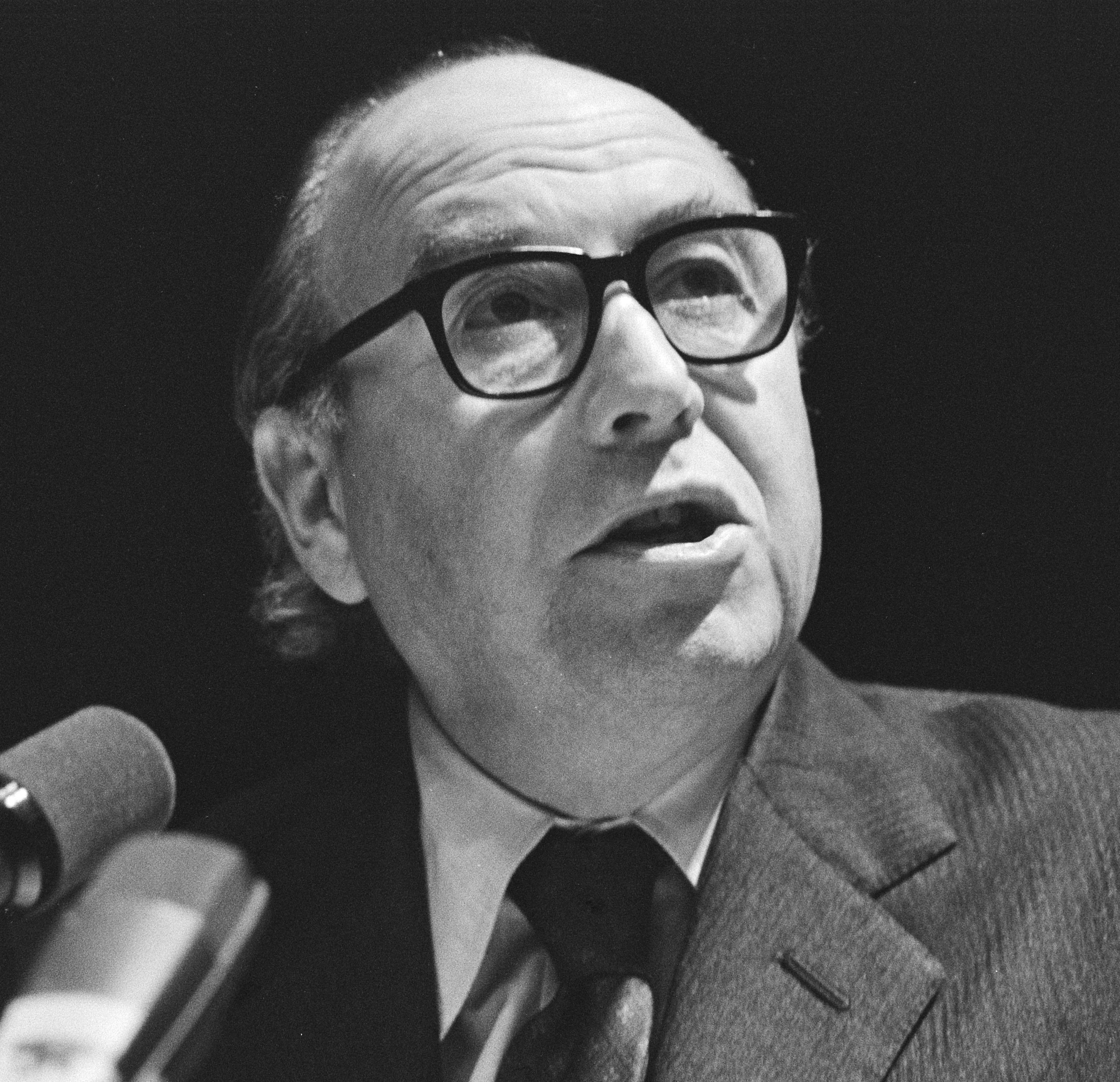
Roy Jenkins, former President of the European Commission

- Lord Jenkins, former Chancellor of the Exchequer, Home Secretary, President of the European Commission and Chancellor of the University of Oxford (did not graduate)
- David Bahati, State Minister of Finance for Planning in the Cabinet of Uganda
- Jeffrey Cuthbert, Gwent Police and Crime Commissioner, MS for Caerphilly and Welsh Government Minister for Communities and Tackling Poverty
- Wayne David, MP for Caerphilly and UK Shadow Minister for Europe, Shadow Minister for Defence Procurement and Shadow Minister for the Armed Forces
- Elin Jones, MS for Ceredigion, former Llywydd of the Senedd, and Welsh Government Minister for Finance
- Fatou Sanyang Kinteh, Gambian Minister for Women's Affairs, Children and Social Welfare
- Glenys Kinnock, MEP and UK Foreign Office Minister
- Neil Kinnock, MP for Bedwellty and for Islwyn, Leader of the Labour Party, Leader of the Opposition
- Sajjad Gani Lone, Indian politician and president of the Jammu and Kashmir People's Conference
- Hilary Marquand, MP for Cardiff East and Minister for Health.
- Robert Minhinnick, co-founder of Friends of the Earth (Cymru)
- Adam Price, MS, former leader of Plaid Cymru and Welsh Government Minister for Enterprise
- David Rees, MS for Aberavon and Deputy Presiding Officer of the Senedd Cymru.
- Brian Wilson, MP for Cunninghame North and Minister of State.

=== Academia ===
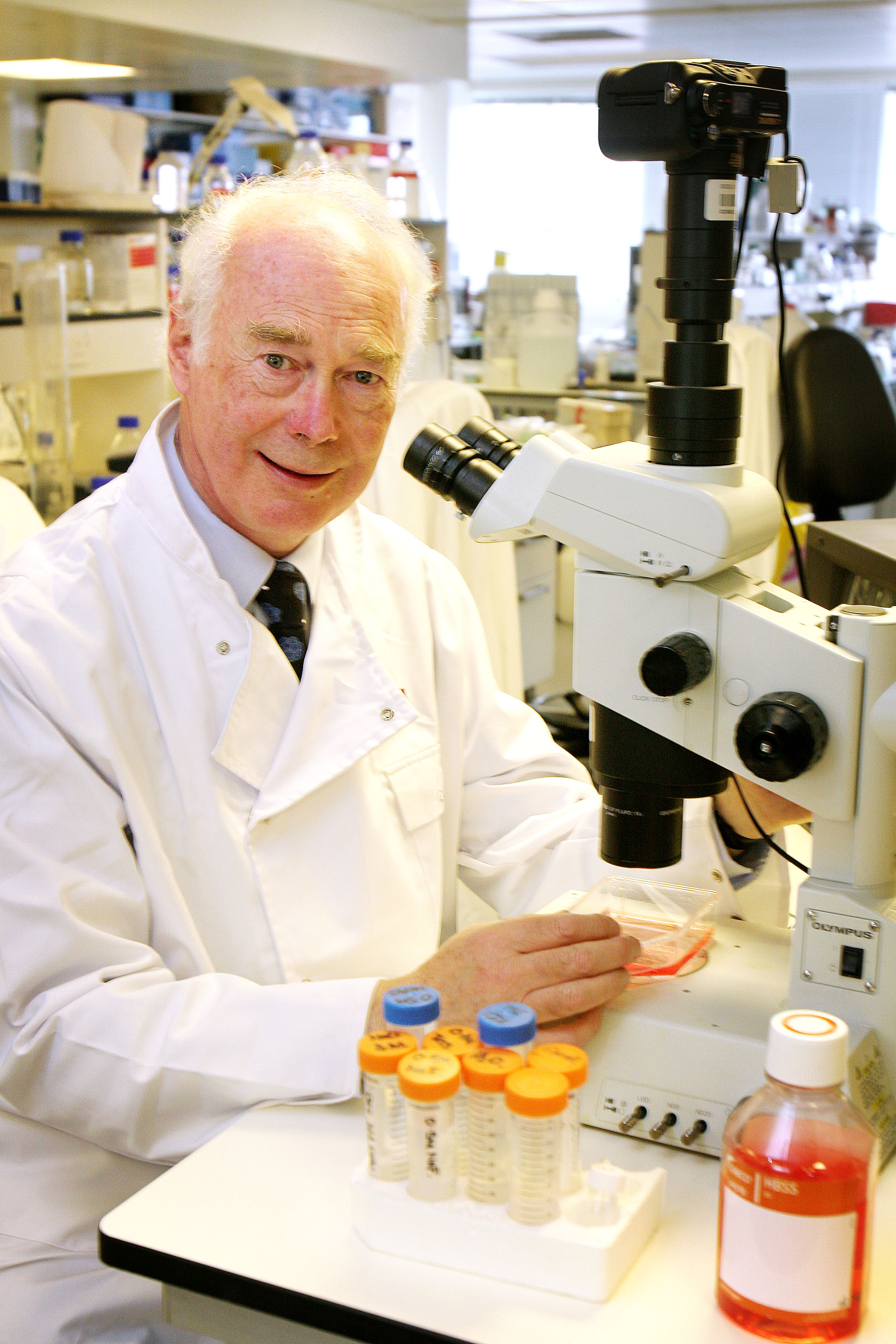
Martin Evans, Nobel Laureate in Physiology or Medicine

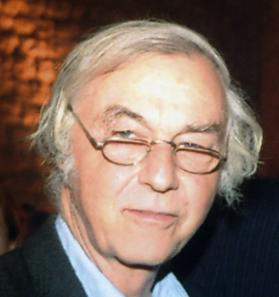
Robert Huber, Nobel Laureate in Chemistry

- Martin J. Ball, emeritus Professor of Linguistics at Bangor University, Cymru/Wales
- Paul E. A. Barbier, Professor of French at the University of Leeds
- Jason Barker, professor
- Yehuda Bauer, Professor of Holocaust Studies at the Avraham Harman Institute of Contemporary Jewry at the Hebrew University of Jerusalem
- Leszek Borysiewicz, Vice-Chancellor of the University of Cambridge
- Archie Cochrane, pioneer of scientific method in medicine
- Peter Coles, Professor of Astrophysics
- Martin Evans, Nobel Prize for Medicine 2007
- John S. Fossey, Professor of synthetic chemistry at the University of Birmingham
- Burt Goldberg, university professor, microbiologist
- Robert Huber, Professor of Chemistry, Nobel Laureate in Chemistry 1988
- John Loughlin, Professor of Politics
- Vaughan Lowe, Chichele Professor of Public International Law in the University of Oxford
- Patrick Minford, Professor of Applied Economics
- John Warwick Montgomery – American lawyer and theologian; Distinguished Research Professor of Philosophy and Christian Thought at Patrick Henry College.
- Keith Peters, Regius Professor of Physic in the University of Cambridge
- Leighton Durham Reynolds, emeritus Professor of Classical Languages and Literature, University of Oxford
- H. W. Lloyd Tanner, Professor of Mathematics and Astronomy (1883–1909)
- Pamela Taylor, Professor of Forensic Psychiatry since 2004
- Keith Ward, philosopher, Gresham Professor of Divinity, Gresham College
- Chandra Wickramasinghe, mathematician, astronomer and astrobiologist, Professor of Applied Mathematics
- Rheinallt Nantlais Williams, professor of the philosophy of religion, principal of the United Theological College, Aberystwyth

=== Business ===
- Spencer Dale, Chief economist, Bank of England
- Andrew Gould, chairman and former CEO, Schlumberger
- Philip Jansen, CEO, BT Group
- Dame Mary Perkins, co-founder, Specsavers
- John Pettigrew (businessman), CEO, National Grid plc
- Lorenzo Simonelli, CEO, Baker Hughes Company

=== Religion ===
- Phil Ashey, Bishop of Western Anglicans
- Gregory Cameron, Bishop of St Asaph
- Paul Colton, Bishop of Cork, Cloyne and Ross
- Dominic Walker, Bishop of Monmouth

=== Sport ===
- Nathan Cleverly, professional boxer and former WBO light heavyweight world champion
- Gareth Davies, former Wales and British and Irish Lions international rugby union player, and former chief executive of Cardiff Rugby Football Club
- Gerald Davies, former Wales and British and Irish Lions international rugby union player
- Alex Gough, Squash player
- Mike Hall, former Wales and British and Irish Lions international rugby union player
- Heather Knight, English cricketer
- Steven Outerbridge, Bermudian cricketer
- Jamie Roberts, Wales and British and Irish Lions international rugby union player
- James Tomlinson, English cricketer
- Bradley Wadlan, Welsh cricketer

=== Arts and journalism ===
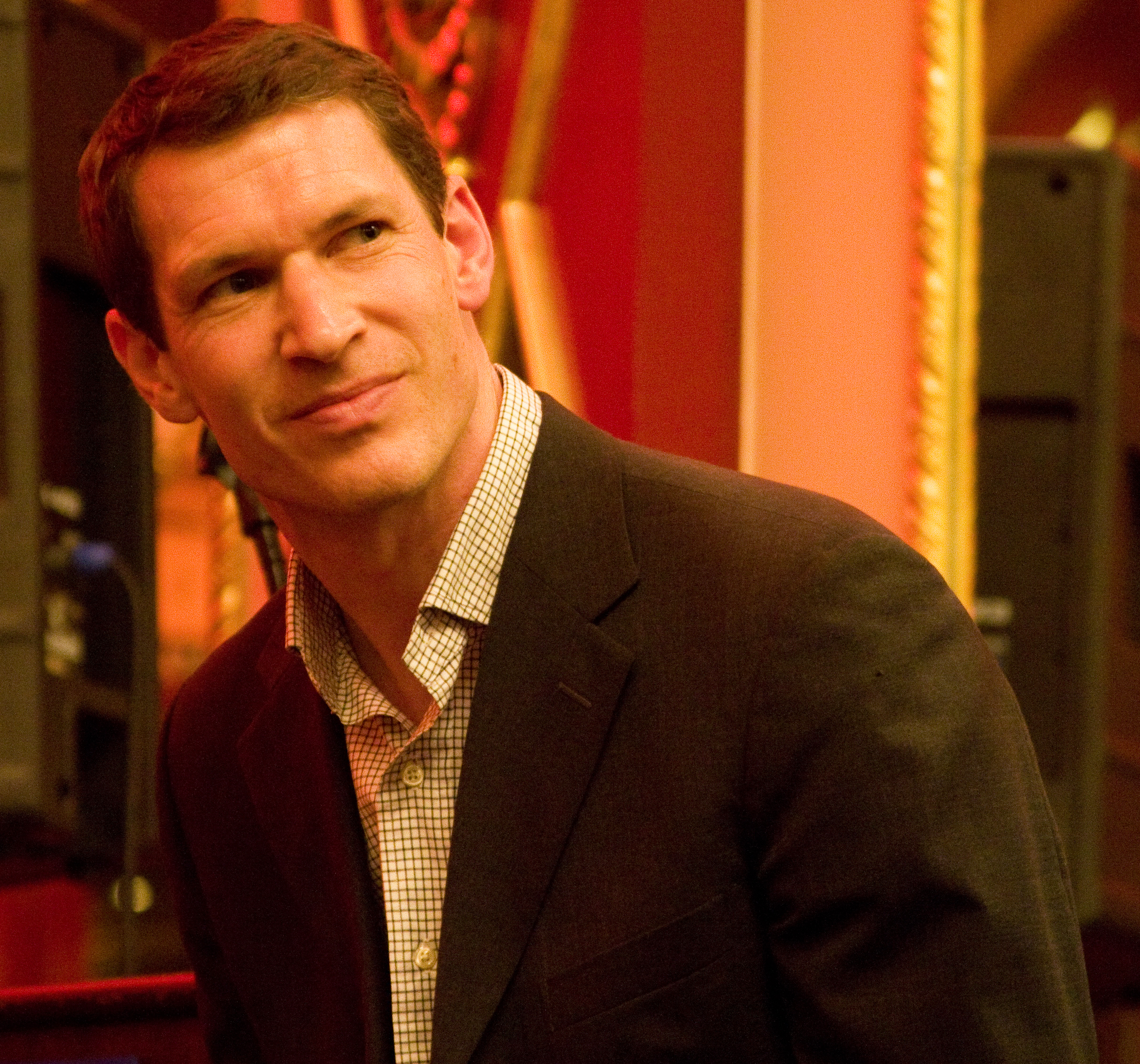
Tim Hetherington, nominee of the Academy Award for Best Documentary Feature in 2011

- Paul Atherton, television and film producer and director
- Matt Barbet, journalist and television presenter
- Manish Bhasin, journalist and television presenter
- Nick Broomfield, documentary filmmaker and receiver of the BAFTA Lifetime Achievement Award for Contribution to Documentary
- Philip Cashian, composer
- Suw Charman-Anderson, journalist and social software consultant.
- Adrian Chiles, television presenter
- Gillian Clarke, poet and receiver of the Queen's gold medal for Poetry
- Huw Edwards, journalist and BBC newsreader
- Ken Elias, artist and painter
- Brian J. Ford, author, scientist and broadcaster
- Max Foster, anchor of CNN Today
- M. A. Griffiths, poet
- Julia Hartley-Brewer, journalist and television presenter
- Jiang Heping, executive director of the CCTV Sports Programming Centre and Controller of CCTV-5
- Tim Hetherington, photo-journalist and co-director of Academy Award-nominated Restrepo
- Elis James, stand-up comedian and actor
- Alun Hoddinott, composer
- Sioned James (1974–2016), choral conductor
- Karl Jenkins, composer
- Alan Johnston, journalist
- Riz Khan, journalist and television interviewer
- Bernard Knight, crime writer
- Simon Lane, co-founder and Creative director of The Yogscast Ltd
- Gwilym Lee, actor
- Siân Lloyd, television presenter
- Los Campesinos!, six-piece indie pop band
- Philip Madoc, actor
- Paul Moorcraft, writer
- Sharon Morgan, actress
- Joanna Natasegara, documentary producer, Academy Award winner for Netflix documentary The White Helmets
- Siân Phillips, actress
- Susanna Reid, journalist and television presenter
- James Righton, musician
- Leo Rowlands, Welsh musical composer, Catholic priest
- Arlene Sierra, composer
- Ron Smerczak actor
- Mari Strachan, novelist and librarian
- Richard Tait, former BBC governor and BBC trustee
- Matt Taylor, BBC Weather Presenter
- Craig Thomas, author
- Alex Thomson, journalist and television presenter
- Vedhicka, Indian actress
- Grace Williams, composer
- Dafydd Iwan, folk singer and President of Plaid Cymru

=== Law and Justice ===
- Stephen Eyre, High Court judge
- Victoria Starmer, former solicitor for Hodge Jones & Allen, wife of Sir Keir Starmer

== See also ==
- Armorial of UK universities
- College of advanced technology (United Kingdom)
- Education in Wales
- List of universities in Wales
- List of modern universities in Europe (1801–1945)
- List of UK universities
- Town and gown
