= Richard Bedford (geographer) =

New Zealand human geographer (b. 1945)

Richard Bedford CNZM QSO
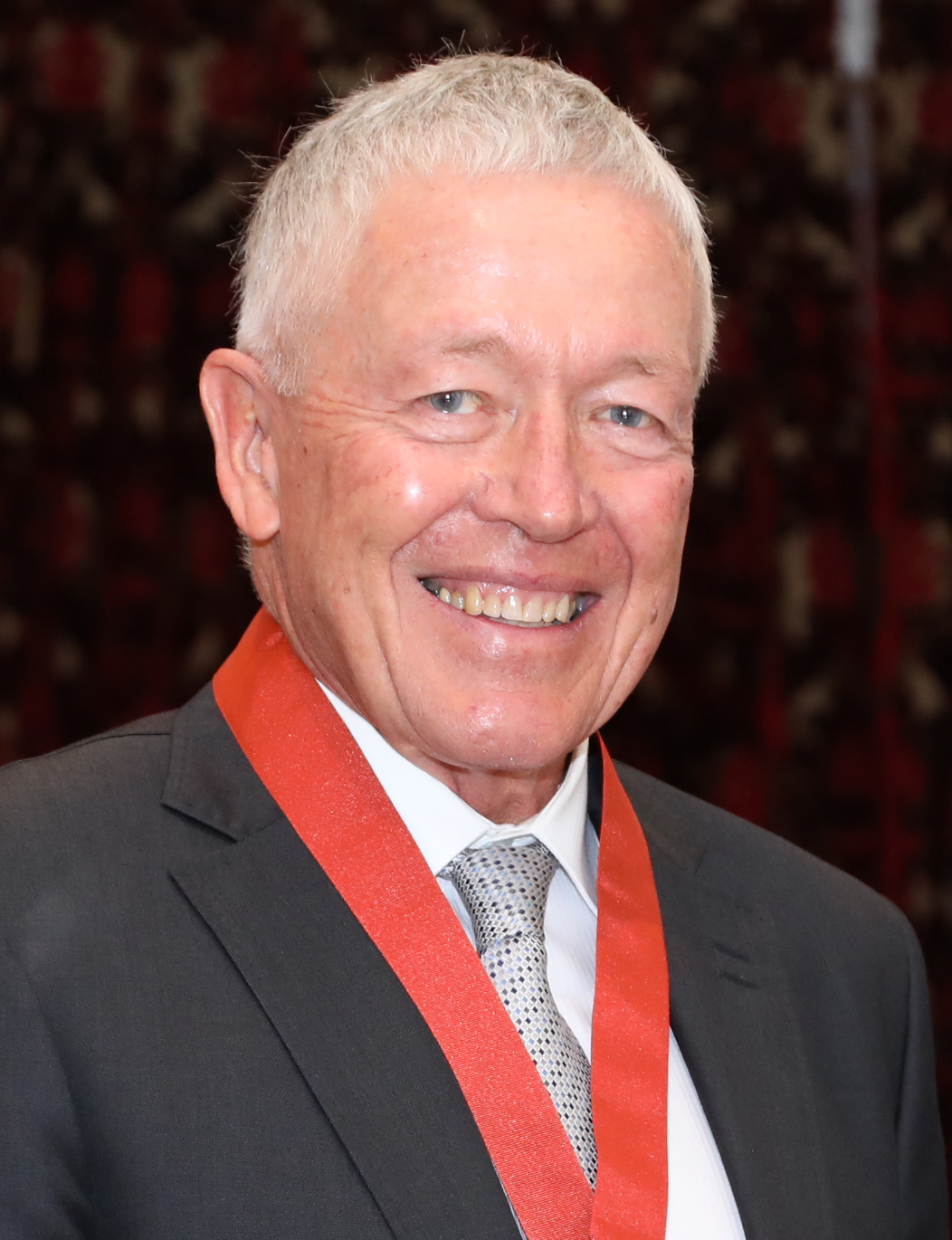
- Bedford in 2020
- Born: Richard Dodgshun Bedford; 3 January 1945 (age 81); Takapuna, New Zealand
- Spouse: Janet Sholto Douglas (m. 1969)
- Children: 2
- Relatives: Harry Bedford (grandfather); Sholto Douglas (father-in-law)

Academic background
- Education: Australian National University
- Theses: Resettlement: solution to economic and social problems in the Gilbert and Ellice Islands Colony (1967); Mobility in transition: an analysis of population movement in the New Hebrides (1971)
- Doctoral advisor: Harold Brookfield; Godfrey Linge

Academic work
- Discipline: Geography
- Sub-discipline: Human geography
- Institutions: University of Canterbury; University of Waikato; Auckland University of Technology
- Doctoral students: Lynda Johnston; Robin Peace; Robyn Longhurst

Richard Dodgshun Bedford CNZM QSO (born 3 January 1945), also known as Dick Bedford, is emeritus professor in human geography at Auckland University of Technology (AUT). He was the president of the Royal Society Te Apārangi from 2015 to 2018.

== Early life ==
Bedford was born in 1945 in Takapuna. His parents were Beryl (née Sanders) and John Dodgshun Bedford. His grandfather was the academic and member of parliament Harry Bedford. He received his primary school education in East Taieri, Te Puke, Te Kauwhata, and Campbells Bay. He then attended Rangitoto College before completing a Bachelor of Arts in 1965 and a Master of Arts in 1967 at the University of Auckland. The title of his master's thesis was Resettlement: solution to economic and social problems in the Gilbert and Ellice Islands Colony. He gained his PhD from the Australian National University in Canberra in 1972, with the title of his doctoral thesis as Mobility in transition: an analysis of population movement in the New Hebrides.

In 1969, he married Janet Sholto Douglas, the daughter of Royal Air Force senior commander Sholto Douglas. They were to have one son and one daughter.

== Career ==
From 1972 to 1989, Bedford was a geography lecturer at the University of Canterbury. From 1989, he was professor of geography at the University of Waikato. He retired from the university and in 2014, Waikato awarded him the title emeritus professor.

In 2010, Bedford moved to Auckland University of Technology (AUT) as pro vice-chancellor research. In 2016, AUT also awarded Bedford the title emeritus professor.

Notable students include Lynda Johnston, Robin Peace and Robyn Longhurst.

Bedford was president of the Royal Society Te Apārangi from July 2015 to July 2018.

== Honours and awards ==
Bedford was awarded the New Zealand 1990 Commemoration Medal. He was elected Fellow of the Royal Society of New Zealand in 2000. He was awarded Distinguished New Zealand Geographer in 2007. In the 2008 New Year Honours, he was appointed Companion of the Queen's Service Order (QSO) for services to geography. In the 2020 New Year Honours, he was appointed Companion of the New Zealand Order of Merit (CNZM) for services to governance.

Professional and academic associations
Preceded by David Skegg	President of the Royal Society of New Zealand; 2015–2018	Succeeded by Wendy Larner
