= List of honorary fellows of St Catherine's College, Oxford =

Honorary Fellows of St Catherine's College, Oxford.

- Sir Geoffrey Allen
- Aru Arumugam
- Sir Michael Atiyah
- Michael Billington
- John Birt, Baron Birt
- Sir Victor Blank
- Christopher Brown
- Richard Carwardine
- Noam Chomsky
- Sir John Cornforth
- David Daniell
- Sir Ian Dove
- Sir Brian Fender
- Peter Galbraith
- Mark Getty
- John B. Goodenough
- Sir James Gowans
- Anthony Henfrey
- Nigel Hitchin
- Giles Keating
- Sir Cameron Mackintosh
- Peter Mandelson, Baron Mandelson
- Sir Patrick Nairne
- Masaki Orita
- Nicanor Parra
- Tom Phillips
- Raymond Plant, Baron Plant of Highfield
- Graeme Segal
- Vee Meng Shaw
- Sir Brian Smith
- Nicholas Stern, Baron Stern of Brentford
- Sir John Walker
- Leonard Wolfson, Baron Wolfson
- Ruth Wolfson, Lady Wolfson
