= David Grant (engineer) =

British academic (born 1947)

Sir David Grant CBE FREng FIET FLSW
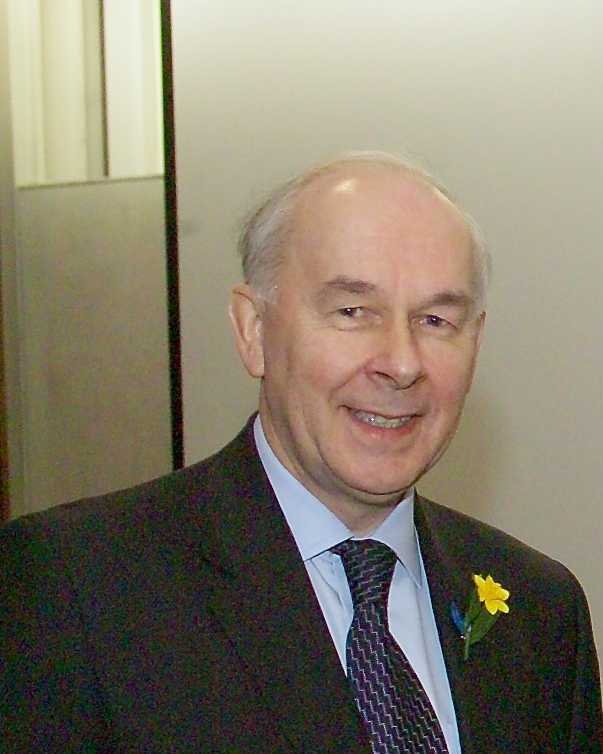
- Sir David Grant in 2006
- Born: September 12, 1947 (age 78)
- Education: Durham University (PhD)
- Awards: IEE's Mensforth Gold Medal (1996)
- Scientific career
- Fields: Engineering
- Workplaces: Notable workplaces: Renishaw plc; IQE; Dstl; General Electric Company; Dowty Group
- Thesis: The surface resistivity of a cooled glass surface at the onset of water vapour condensation (1974)
- Academic advisors: Dr E. C. Salthouse

Vice-chancellor of Cardiff University
- In office 2001–2012
- Preceded by: Sir Brian Smith
- Succeeded by: Colin Riordan

Vice President of the Royal Academy of Engineering
- In office 2007–2012

Sir David Grant CBE FREng FIET FLSW (born 12 September 1947) is a British academic who was the vice-chancellor of Cardiff University in Wales from 2001 to 2012. Following his appointment, Grant oversaw the merger between Cardiff University and the University of Wales College of Medicine, which was completed in 2004, and the award of university status to Cardiff.

He gained his PhD in engineering science from Durham University in 1974. Prior to his appointment at Cardiff University, Grant worked for the Dowty Group and then became director of technology at the General Electric Company (1991–2001). He was awarded the Mensforth International Gold Medal by the Institution of Electrical Engineers in 1996.

He became a Fellow of the Royal Academy of Engineering in 1997, and was a vice-president from 2007 to 2012. He is also a former council member of the Engineering and Physical Sciences Research Council, and was a governing board member of Innovate UK (formerly the Technology Strategy Board). He served on the board of the Defence Science and Technology Laboratory from 2012 to 2018, and was chair of the Science, Technology, Engineering and Mathematics Network until 2018.

Grant is a non-executive director of Renishaw plc and of IQE, and chair of the National Physical Laboratory.

He was elected an Honorary Fellow of Wolfson College, Cambridge in 2000.

He was elected a Fellow of the Learned Society of Wales in 2018.

Grant was appointed a Commander of the Order of the British Empire in 1997 for his contribution to the UK Foresight Programme, and was knighted in the 2016 Birthday Honours for services to engineering, technology, and skills.

Academic offices
Preceded by Sir Brian Smith	Vice-chancellor of Cardiff University; 2001–2012	Succeeded by Colin Riordan
