= Ivor Crewe =

British political scientist

Sir Ivor Crewe FAcSS DL
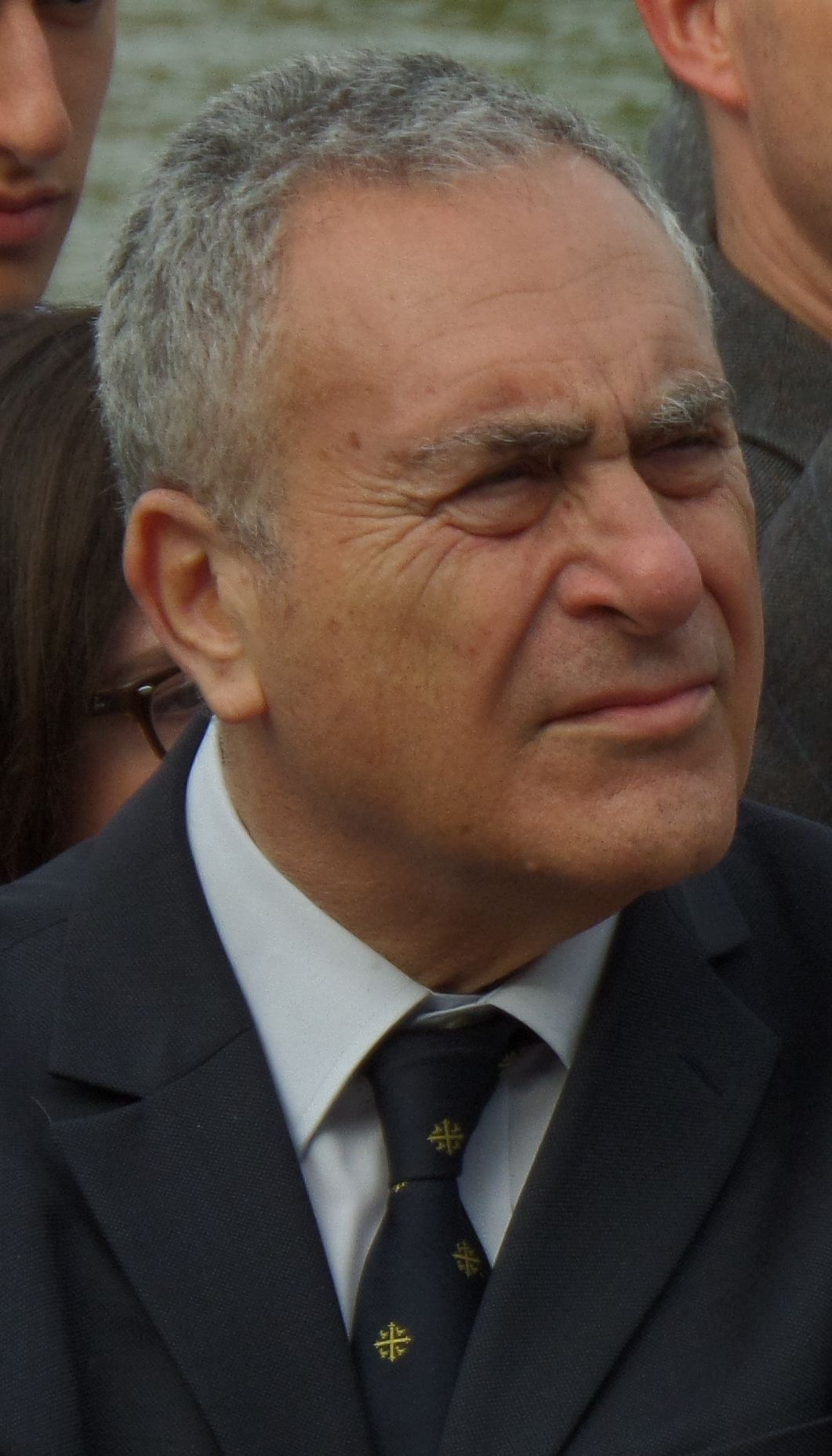
- Sir Ivor Crewe at the 2014 Eights Week, on the River Thames in Oxford.

Master of University College, Oxford
- In office 2008–2020
- Preceded by: Lord Butler of Brockwell
- Succeeded by: Valerie Amos, Baroness Amos

Vice-Chancellor of the University of Essex
- In office 1995–2007
- Preceded by: Ron Johnston
- Succeeded by: Colin Riordan

Personal details
- Born: 15 December 1945 (age 80) England, UK
- Spouse: Jill Crewe
- Children: Deborah Crewe, Ben Crewe, Daniel Crewe
- Education: Exeter College, Oxford

Sir Ivor Martin Crewe DL FAcSS (born 15 December 1945) is a former Master of University College, Oxford, and President of the Academy of Social Sciences. He was previously Vice-Chancellor of the University of Essex and also a Professor in the Department of Government at Essex.

== Early life and education ==
The son of Jewish refugees from Czechoslovakia and Germany, Crewe was educated at Manchester Grammar School and then went to Exeter College, Oxford, where he gained a first-class BA in Philosophy, Politics, and Economics in 1966. In 1968 he received his MSc (Econ.) from the London School of Economics and Political Science where he earned the SSRC (now, the ESRC) post-graduate award.

== Academic career ==
Crewe was appointed as an Assistant Lecturer in Politics at Lancaster University at the age of 21, before returning to Oxford in 1969 for two years as a Junior Research Fellow, thereafter moving to a Lectureship at the Department of Government at the University of Essex in 1971.

At Essex, Crewe was director of the ESRC Data Archive from 1974 to 1982, and co-director of the British Election Study from 1973-81. With Dr David Rose, he established the Research Centre for Micro-Social Change and the British Household Panel Study in 1989, which became the Institute of Social and Economic Research at Essex in 1994. From 1977-82, Crewe was editor of the British Journal of Political Science and from 1984-92 he was a co-editor.

Crewe undertook extensive research from the early 1970s to the mid-1990s in elections and voting behaviour, and published his results in Decade of Dealignment (1983, with Bo Sarlvik) and numerous articles, including the influential 'Partisan Dealignment in Britain 1964–74', British Journal of Political Science, 7(2), pp. 129–90 (with Bo Sarlvik and James Alt), which argued that voters' identification with the Conservative and Labour Parties was steadily weakening as a result of the decline in class loyalty and in the connections voters made between class interests and party policies.

He was a frequent commentator on UK elections for television and the press. He argued that the Labour Party was destined for electoral defeat as the traditional working class contracted unless it both appealed to a wider social constituency embracing other classes and revised its assumptions about the policies that would appeal to a majority of voters. He regarded the electoral success of New Labour in the 1997 and 2001 general elections as a vindication of his electoral analysis.

In 1995 he published (with Anthony King) a study of the Social Democratic Party (SDP), a breakaway from the Labour Party, which for him represented a symptom of the crumbling of the old foundations of Britain's two-party system.

From 1995 to 1 September 2007, Crewe was the Vice-Chancellor of the University of Essex and is a former Chair of the 1994 Group and President of Universities UK. As President of UUK from 2003 to 2005, he mobilised university Vice-Chancellors in favour of the Government's proposal to introduce tuition fees.

In July 2008, Crewe succeeded Lord Butler of Brockwell as Master of University College, Oxford. In 2013 Crewe and King published The Blunders of our Governments, a study of major failures of public policy in modern Britain. Peter Preston's review in The Guardian commented "It should be a deeply distressing account of blunders past, present and pending from two of our most brilliant political analysts, but in fact you have to smile gallantly through many of the disasters that throng 400 or more of these pages".

He gave many lectures of the subject of Britain being Badly Governed including to the Manchester Literary & Philosophical Society RAMSDEN LECTURE, on 9 December 2015 where notes of his lecture may be viewed.

== Honours ==
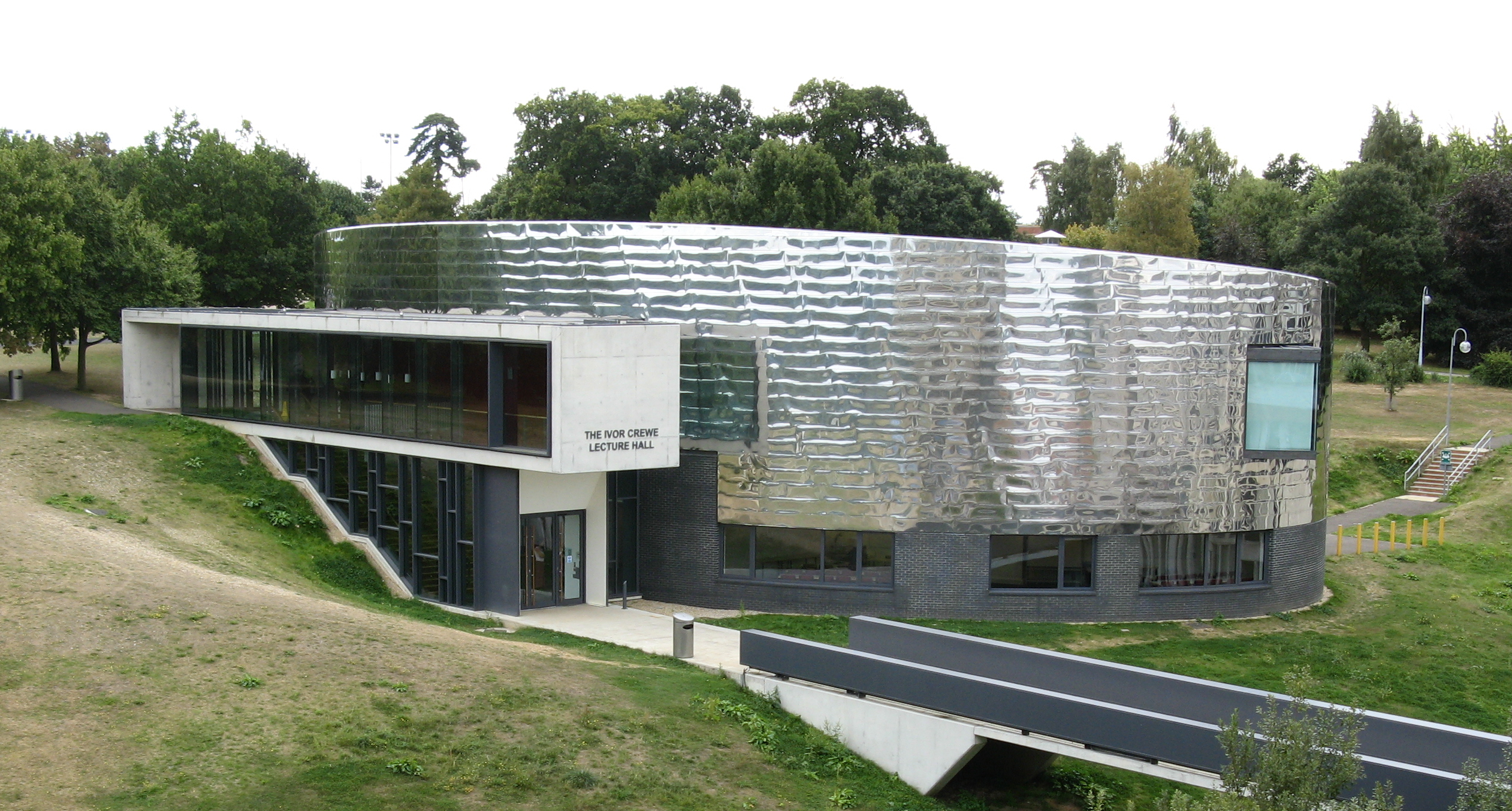
The Ivor Crewe Lecture Hall at the University of Essex, completed in 2006.

Crewe was appointed Knight Bachelor in the 2006 New Year Honours.

Named in his honour and designed by the architect Patel Taylor, the Ivor Crewe Lecture Hall at the University of Essex was completed in 2006. The building was nominated for a Civic Trust Award in 2008.

== Bibliography ==
- Ivor Crewe, 'The Electorate: Partisan Dealignment Ten Years On (1984)', West European Politics, 6(4), pp. 183–215.
- Ivor Crewe, 'Has the Electorate Become Thatcherite?', in Robert Skidelsky (ed.), Thatcherism (Chatto & Windus, 1988), pp. 25–49.
- Ivor Crewe, 'Values: The Crusade that Failed' in Dennis Kavanagh and Anthony Seldon (eds.), The Thatcher Effect (Oxford University Press, 1989), pp. 239–50.
- Ivor Crewe, 'Margaret Thatcher: As the British Saw Her', The Public Perspective, Vol. 2(2), January/February 1991, pp. 15–17.
- Ivor Crewe, 'The Thatcher legacy', in Anthony King (ed.), Britain at the Polls, 1992 (Chatham House, 1992), pp. 1–28.
- Ivor Crewe, 'Electoral Behaviour' in Dennis Kavanagh and Anthony Seldon (eds.), The Major Effect (Macmillan, 1994), pp. 99–121.
- Ivor Crewe and Anthony King, SDP: The Birth, Life and Death of the British Social Democratic Party (Oxford University Press, 1995).
- Ivor Crewe and Anthony King, The Blunders of our Governments (Oneworld Publications, 2013).

Academic offices
| Preceded by Ron Johnston | Vice-Chancellor of the University of Essex; 1995–2007 | Succeeded by Colin Riordan |
| Preceded by Lord Butler of Brockwell | Master of University College, Oxford; 2008–2020 | Succeeded by Valerie Amos |
