= Wendy Larner =

New Zealand social scientist and geographer

Wendy Larner FAcSS FLSW FRSNZ FNZGS
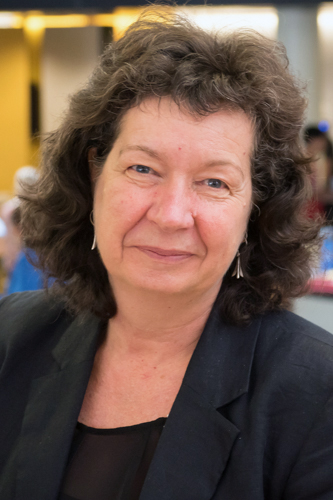
- Larner in 2016

Vice Chancellor of Cardiff University
- Incumbent
- Assumed office September 2023
- Preceded by: Colin Riordan

Provost of Victoria University of Wellington
- In office 2015–2023
- Preceded by: Neil Quigley
- Succeeded by: Bryony James

President of the Royal Society of New Zealand
- In office 2018–2021
- Preceded by: Richard Bedford
- Succeeded by: Brent Clothier

Personal details
- Born: Wendy Joan Larner; 2 March 1963 (age 63) New Zealand
- Awards: Victoria Medal from the Royal Geographical Society (2018); New Zealand Women of Influence Award (2018)

Academic background
- Education: University of Waikato (BSocSci); University of Canterbury (MA); Carleton University (PhD)
- Thesis: The 'New Zealand experiment': Towards a Poststructuralist Political Economy (1997)

Academic work
- Discipline: Human Geography, Sociology
- Institutions: Cardiff University; Victoria University of Wellington; University of Bristol; University of Auckland; University of Waikato
- Main interests: Globalisation, Political economy, Feminism

Wendy Joan Larner FAcSS FLSW FRSNZ FNZGS (born 2 March 1963) is a New Zealand social scientist who has focussed on the interdisciplinary areas of globalisation, governance and gender. She has been Vice-Chancellor and President of Cardiff University since September 2023.

== Career ==
Larner has a master's degree from the University of Canterbury, with a thesis titled Migration and female labour: Samoan women in New Zealand. Larner went on to earn a PhD in Sociology and Anthropology from Carleton University in Canada with her thesis titled The 'New Zealand experiment': Towards a post-structuralist political economy.

Larner was Professor of Human Geography and Sociology at the University of Bristol. In 2015, she was appointed provost at Victoria University, Wellington, New Zealand.

In September 2023, Larner became Vice-Chancellor and President of Cardiff University.

On 28 January 2025, the university announced plans to cut 400 full-time academic positions at the university (13% of total staff), to abolish the music, nursing, modern languages, ancient history, and religion and theology programmes, and to merge various subjects into larger 'schools'. Larner said that the university needed to address a £31 million budget gap and to secure a viable future. On 4 February, there were protests against the cuts outside the Welsh Senedd and Larner was invited to attend the Senedd's education committee to discuss what led to the proposals, the concerns around them and final plans. In the same month, the Cardiff branch of the UCU voted to hold an all-staff motion of no confidence in Larner. In June 2025, the University Council approved a scaled back plan, described as "painful but necessary" by the University Chancellor, that will save £22 million a year but warned the move will still not completely address the financial challenges the institution faces.

In September 2025, Cardiff University officially inaugurated Cardiff University Kazakhstan in Astana, its first overseas branch campus and the only campus of a Russell Group research university in Central Asia. Professor Larner described the launch as a pivotal step in the institution's global ambitions and the British Ambassador to Kazakhstan said that the opening will bring more world-class British academic excellence to Kazakh students and further strengthening the ties between the countries.

== Recognition ==
Larner is a Fellow of the Royal Society Te Apārangi, having transferred from an honorary fellowship in 2016, a Fellow of the Academy of Social Sciences (United Kingdom) and a Fellow of the New Zealand Geographical Society. She has been a visiting fellow at universities in Germany, the United States and the United Kingdom. She was awarded the Victoria Medal in 2018 by the Royal Geographical Society. In 2018, Larner was awarded the Innovation and Science award of the Women of Influence awards.

In 2017, Larner was selected as one of the Royal Society Te Apārangi's "150 women in 150 words", celebrating the contributions of women to knowledge in New Zealand. In July 2018 she became the President of the Royal Society Te Apārangi, taking over from Richard Bedford.

== Selected publications ==
- Castree, Noel; Chatterton, Paul; Heynen, Nikolas; Larner, Wendy; Wright, Melissa W. (2012). "Introduction: The Point is to Change it". The Point is to Change it: Geographies of Hope and Survival in an Age of Crisis. Wiley-Blackwell. pp. 1–9. doi:10.1002/9781444397352.ch. ISBN 978-1-4443-9735-2. Wikidata Q57606985.
- Larner, Wendy (2000). "Neo-liberalismi Policy, Ideology, Governmentality". Studies in Political Economy. 63 (1): 5–25. doi:10.1080/19187033.2000.11675231. Wikidata Q61012150.
- Richard G. Kyle; Milligan, Christine; Robin A. Kearns; Larner, Wendy; Nicholas R. Fyfe; Liz Bondi (2010). "The Tertiary Turn: Locating "The Academy" in Autobiographical Accounts of Activism in Manchester, UK and Auckland, Aotearoa New Zealand". Antipode. 43 (4): 1181–1214. doi:10.1111/j.1467-8330.2010.00820.x. Wikidata Q61465236.
- Molloy, Maureen; Larner, Wendy (2013). Fashioning globalisation: New Zealand design, working women and the cultural economy. Wiley-Blackwell. pp. 200 pages.

Professional and academic associations
Preceded by Richard Bedford	President of the Royal Society of New Zealand; 2018–2021	Succeeded by Brent Clothier
Academic offices
Preceded by Colin Riordan	Vice-Chancellor of Cardiff University; September 2023 – present	Succeeded by Incumbent
