= IQE =

British semiconductor company

IQE PLC
- Type: Public
- Traded as: AIM: IQE
- Industry: Semiconductors
- Founded: 1988; 38 years ago in Cardiff, Wales, UK
- Founders: Drew Nelson; Michael Scott
- Headquarters: Cardiff, United Kingdom
- Area served: Global
- Key people: Jutta Meier (CEO and CFO)
- Products: Epitaxial wafers
- Revenue: ▲£167.5 million (2021)
- Operating income: ▼£−72.9 million (2021)
- Net income: ▼£−74.5 million (2021)
- Total assets: ▼£296.1 million (2021)
- Total equity: ▼£175.1 million (2021)
- Number of employees: 685 (end 2021)
- Website: iqep.com

IQE PLC is a British semiconductor company founded 1988 in Cardiff, Wales, which manufactures advanced epitaxial wafers.

The company is headquartered in Cardiff with an Innovation Centre and factories in Newport, Wales, Cardiff, Wales and Milton Keynes in the United Kingdom; Taunton, Massachusetts, Greensboro, North Carolina, and Spokane, Washington in the United States; and Taiwan in Asia.

== History ==
IQE was founded by Drew Nelson and Michael Scott in 1988 as Epitaxial Products International (EPI). Initially, the company specialised in producing epitaxial wafers for optoelectronic devices used primarily in fiber-optic communication. Metal Organic Chemical Vapor Deposition (MOCVD) technology was used to produce semiconductor lasers, light-emitting diodes (LEDs) and photodetectors designed to operate at wavelengths of 1300 nm and 1550 nm utilised for long distance fiber-optic communications.

In 1999, Epitaxial Products International merged with Pennsylvania-based Quantum Epitaxial Designs (QED) to form IQE. QED was founded by Tom Hierl.

Also in 1999, the newly merged entity underwent an initial public offering (IPO) on the European EASDAQ (NASDAQ Europe) stock exchange, followed a year later by a listing on the London Stock Exchange.

The merger with QED brought to the group a range of new manufacturing tools based on molecular beam epitaxy (MBE) technology and a range of products for the wireless telecommunications. Following the merger, IQE became the first independent outsource manufacturer of both optoelectronic and radio frequency (RF) epitaxial wafers produced using both MOCVD and MBE technologies. The Bethlehem facility specialised in a number of wireless products including pseudomorphic high electron mobility transistors (pHEMTs) and metal semiconductor field-effect transistors (MESFETs).

In 2000, the company formed a new, wholly owned subsidiary company specialising in silicon based epitaxy. IQE Silicon was established in a new facility adjacent to the group's headquarters and European manufacturing base in Cardiff, Wales, UK. The new subsidiary used chemical vapor deposition (CVD) tools to produce silicon and germanium epitaxial wafers for enhanced silicon processing performance, microelectromechanical systems (MEMS) and nanotechnology applications.

Also in 2000, the group acquired Wafer Technology based in Milton Keynes, UK. The acquisition provided the group with in-house production of gallium arsenide (GaAs) and indium phosphide (InP) substrates as well as adding capabilities for gallium antimonide (GaSb) and indium antimonide (InSb) for infrared applications.

In 2006, the Group acquired the Electronic Materials Division from Emcore, providing IQE with its second US operation based in Somerset, NJ. This acquisition added further MOCVD capacity and complementary radio frequency (RF) products including heterojunction bipolar transistors (HBTs) and bipolar field-effect transistors (BiFETs).

Also in 2006, the group made a further acquisition in the form of Singapore based MBET technologies which provided the group with complete multi-site, multi-technology and multi-product capabilities to form the world's largest independent contract manufacturer of epitaxial wafers. In 2009 the group added new free-standing gallium nitride (GaN) substrate capability with the acquisition of NanoGaN, a spin out start-up from the University of Bath.

In 2012, IQE Group acquired Galaxy Compound Semiconductors, based in Spokane, Washington, US, and MBE epitaxy manufacturing unit of RFMD, based in Greensboro, North Carolina, US.

The company made a stock exchange announcement on 12 November 2018 that shipments of its product would be materially reduced, also materially affecting profitability, causing the share price to plunge.

The joint venture CSDC was acquired by IQE in October 2019. IQE had held 51% of shares through MBE Technologies at the time it was formed in March 2015.

== Products ==
IQE produces epitaxial wafers from gallium arsenide (GaAs), gallium nitride (GaN) as well as indium phosphide (InP) and silicon. The wafers made from GaAs and GaN have a diameter of 8 inches and can be used for MicroLED displays, while the 6 inch InP wafers are aimed at electro-optic devices.
