= Evelyn Stokes =

New Zealand geographer

Dame Evelyn Stokes DNZM
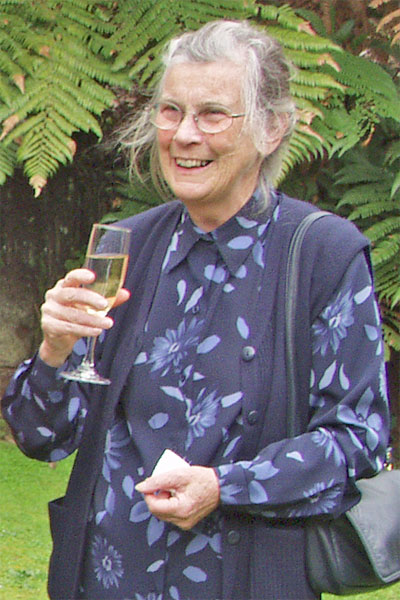
- Stokes in 2003
- Born: Evelyn Mary Dinsdale; 5 December 1936; Tauranga, New Zealand
- Died: 15 August 2005 (aged 68)
- Occupation: Geographer
- Known for: Waitangi Tribunal
- Spouse: Brian Stokes (m. 1964, divorced)
- Awards: Distinguished New Zealand Geographer Medal

Academic background
- Education: Syracuse University

Academic work
- Institutions: University of Waikato
- Doctoral students: Robyn Longhurst

Dame Evelyn Mary Stokes DNZM (née Dinsdale; 5 December 1936 – 15 August 2005) was a professor of geography at the University of Waikato in New Zealand and a member of the New Zealand government's Waitangi Tribunal. Throughout her life she worked for recognition of marginalised groups including women and Māori, and she published extensively on New Zealand historical geography and on Māori land issues.

== Biography ==
Evelyn Mary Dinsdale was born in Tauranga, New Zealand, on 5 December 1936. She was educated at Tauranga Primary School and Tauranga College, where she was one of the first non-Māori to join the local kapa haka group. She then went to Canterbury University College, earning a master's degree with first class honours in geography in 1959.

After earning this degree, she took a postgraduate teacher training course from Christchurch Teachers' College and taught briefly at Te Kuiti High School, fulfilling the requirements of the post primary teachers' bursary that had funded her education.

Dinsdale was awarded a Fulbright Travel Grant and a Smith-Mundt Grant from the United States government in 1960, freeing her to travel to Syracuse University, where she received her PhD in 1963 under the supervision of Donald Meinig. While in America, she demonstrated long poi swinging on television.

Soon after her return to New Zealand, in 1964, she married Brian Stokes, changing her name to Evelyn Stokes; they had two children. Although Evelyn and Brian Stokes later divorced, Dr. Stokes continued to use her married name professionally for the rest of her career.

Stokes was appointed to a lecturership with the University of Auckland, and taught for a year for their Waikato branch before becoming a member of the geography department at Waikato University when that university was founded in 1964. At Waikato, she worked hard to promote Māori studies and to integrate local Māori communities into the university's activities, and she continued to serve as a faculty member for nearly 41 years, the longest tenure among the Waikato staff. In 1969 she was promoted to Senior Lecturer, and in 1975 to Reader. In the early 1970s, unusually for geography departments in New Zealand, the department at Waikato split into two, with physical geography moving to the Department of Earth Sciences; Stokes remained with the renamed Department of Human Geography and Environmental Studies in the Faculty of Arts and Social Sciences. Johnson recalls her as "a wise but stroppy woman, someone who would have no truck with fools but who opened her heart, her mind and her home to those whose intellect and politics she respected", and she was known as the "kuia" (a Māori word for a wise old woman) of the geography department.

Stokes died on 15 August 2005, aged 68, with her tangihanga being held at Te Kohinga Mārama marae on the Hamilton campus of the University of Waikato.

== Academic work ==
Stokes was founding editor of the New Zealand Journal of Geography, which she formed from what was previously a pamphlet, the New Zealand Geographical Society Record, and for 10 years she served as its editor. Two major areas of Stokes' academic publication were on the history of the Tauranga area of New Zealand and of the Māori. She edited Te Raupatu o Tauranga Moana, a collection of written works related to the Tauranga area, her Masters thesis work was on settlements in the Tauranga area, and in 1980 she published a book on the history of Tauranga County which Bedford calls "the definitive history" of the area and for which she received the J. M. Sherrard "Major Award" in regional history. Māori resource use more generally was the subject of over 30 of her papers.

Another of Stokes' many interests was geography education at the secondary school level. She published a series of 20 papers aimed at the curricular needs for this level in both the New Zealand Journal of Geography and the New Zealand Geographer, and served from 1976 to 1987 as a member of New Zealand's National Geography Curriculum Committee.

An early experience that shaped Stokes' feminist views was her service as a high school teacher, for which she was paid £100 less per year than men with equivalent levels of experience due to her gender. With Anne Magee, Stokes helped establish gender studies and feminist studies at the University of Waikato in the late 1970s, and from an early date she pushed for feminist perspectives in geography. In 1987 Stokes and four colleagues published a "collective statement" on feminist geography in the New Zealand Geographer; Longhurst and Johnston provide a retrospective look at her work in this area.

Stokes also played an important part in building up the map collection of the University of Waikato: in 1964 she and Michael Selby transferred the New Zealand Geographic Society's collection to Waikato, she was the society's map librarian from 1966 to 1983, and she frequently added to the library with purchases from her travels abroad. Robson writes that "without her Waikato may never have had a Map Library or, at least, it would have been only a much poorer one", and Bedford adds that "her passion for maps has kept a tradition of cartography very much alive for almost 40 years in Waikato's Geography Department". Bedford also states that "her publications are renowned for the meticulous and innovative cartography", and that her skills in this area were put to good use in her service on the editorial committee for the New Zealand Historical Atlas (1991–1997).

== Public service ==
In Stokes' capacity as a member of the Ngāti Tahu Tribal Trust (on which she served from 1980 to 1991) she helped negotiate a major lease of Māori land for the Ohaaki geothermal power plant, a change from previous practices in which the land ownership was transferred to the government. She also worked closely with two other Māori tribes, the Ngāti Tūwharetoa and the Ngāti Hauā, whose chief Wiremu Tamihana was the subject of a major biography published by Stokes.

For nearly 16 years, Stokes served as a member of the Waitangi Tribunal, the New Zealand government commission that adjudicates Māori land claims with respect to the Treaty of Waitangi. Stokes' research on the history of Tauranga County related closely to her work on an important tribunal case on the confiscation of land in the Tauranga area, and her experience with the Ngāti Tahu and Ngāti Tūwharetoa helped guide her work with the Waitangi Tribunal on other cases involving geothermal resources. As part of the Waitangi Tribunal, Stokes worked on major reports on Pouakani, Muriwhenua, Te Maunga railways, Tūrangi township, Mohaka ki Ahuriri, Kaipara, and Hauraki, taking an important role in drafting the reports on these cases.

Stokes served as well for many years on the New Zealand Geographic Board, the body charged with assigning official place names in New Zealand. During her tenure on the board, she helped guide it towards the restoration of indigenous names for places that had been renamed as part of the English colonisation of New Zealand.

== Awards and honours ==
In 1990, the University of Waikato awarded Stokes a personal chair "in recognition of her outstanding contribution to research and teaching". In the same year she was also awarded the New Zealand 1990 Commemoration Medal. In the 2000 New Year Honours, she was appointed a Dame Companion of the New Zealand Order of Merit, for services to tertiary education and Māori. She was the last woman in New Zealand to be made a Dame before that title was replaced by "Distinguished Companion" in 2001, until damehoods were reintroduced in 2009.

In 2001 the New Zealand Geographical Society honoured her with the Distinguished New Zealand Geographer Medal and with life membership in the society; she was the second academic to be so honoured. At that time, Garth Cant remarked that "no one within geography has made a more substantial and sustained contribution to the wholeness and wellbeing of this nation we call Aotearoa/New Zealand in the 1980s and 1990s than Dame Evelyn Stokes".

A special issue of New Zealand Geographer (volume 61, issue 2, August 2005) was devoted to "Evelyn Stokes and Geography at the University of Waikato". Although the articles in it were written prior to Stokes' death, it was not published until soon after her death. On her death, Stokes was honoured with a tangi, a formal three-day Māori funeral ceremony, on Te Kohinga Mārama marae.

In 2006, the University of Waikato inaugurated a lecture series and doctoral scholarship in Stokes' memory. The first lecture in the series, by Malcolm McKinnon, president of the Professional Historians' Association of New Zealand / Aotearoa, was entitled "Mapping the Past: Evelyn Stokes and the History of Aotearoa".

Stokes Peak, a mountain in the Kaimai Range directly above the Kaimai Tunnel near Tauranga, was named in her honour in 2010 by the New Zealand Geographic Board; however the name was discontinued in 2012 after objections from the Ngāti Hinerangi.

In 2017, Stokes was selected as one of the Royal Society Te Apārangi's "150 women in 150 words", celebrating the contributions of women to knowledge in New Zealand.

== Books ==
- Stokes, Evelyn (1980), A History of Tauranga County, Palmerston North, NZ: The Dunmore Press Limited, ISBN 0-908564-51-1.
- Stokes, Evelyn (2002), Wiremu Tamihana: Rangatira, Wellington, NZ: Huia Publishers, ISBN 1-877266-92-2.
