= Lynda Johnston =

New Zealand human geography academic

Lynda Johnston FRSNZ FNZGS
- Born: 1964 (age 61–62)
- Education: University of Waikato
- Awards: Distinguished Service Award, New Zealand Geographical Society
- Scientific career
- Fields: Human geography
- Workplaces: University of Edinburgh, University of Waikato
- Thesis: Body tourism in queered streets : geographies of gay pride parades (1998)
- Doctoral advisor: Richard Bedford; Robin Peace; Robyn Longhurst
- Website: University of Waikato profile

Lynda Tracy Johnston FRSNZ FNZGS (born 1964) is a New Zealand human geography academic. She is a full professor and assistant vice chancellor sustainability at the University of Waikato.

== Academic career ==
After a 1998 PhD titled 'Body tourism in queered streets : geographies of gay pride parades' at the University of Waikato, supervised by Richard Bedford, Robin Peace and Robyn Longhurst, she taught at the University of Edinburgh from 1999 to 2001. Since returning to the University of Waikato, she has been appointed as full professor, while serving as Chair of the Department of Geography and as Deputy Dean and Associate Dean Academic of Te Kura Kete Aronui (the Faculty of Arts and Social Sciences).

Johnston was the editor of the feminist geography journal Gender, Place & Culture from 2011 to 2016. From 2016 to 2020 Johnston was Chair of the Gender and Geography Commission of the International Geographical Union.

She is a Fellow of the New Zealand Geographical Society and served as its President from 2018. In granting her its Distinguished Service Award, the Society noted how "she ensured that feminist geography has remained highly visible in the New Zealand university system."

In 2024 Johnston was elected a Fellow of the Royal Society Te Apārangi.

== Personal life ==
After growing up in Otago, Lynda began tramping in the South Island at age 13 before moving onto rock, ice and mountain climbing at 17. In Aotearoa she has climbed Aoraki / Mount Cook, Mount Aspiring / Tititea, and in the Arthur’s Pass and Fiordland National Parks. Johnston spent three months in the Cordillera Blanca in Peru, regularly climbing over 5000 metres.

== Selected works ==
- Johnston, Lynda. Transforming gender, sex and place: Gender variant geographies. Routledge, 2018.
- Johnston, Lynda, and Robyn Longhurst. Space, place, and sex: Geographies of sexualities. Rowman & Littlefield, 2009.
- Johnston, Lynda, and Gill Valentine. "Wherever I lay my girlfriend, that’s my home." Mapping desire: Geographies of sexualities (1995): 99–113.
- Longhurst, Robyn, Elsie Ho, and Lynda Johnston. "Using ‘the body’ as an ‘instrument of research’: kimch’i and pavlova." Area 40, no. 2 (2008): 208–217.
- Johnston, Lynda. Queering tourism: Paradoxical performances of gay pride parades. Routledge, 2007.
- Longhurst, Robyn, Lynda Johnston, and Elsie Ho. "A visceral approach: Cooking ‘at home’ with migrant women in Hamilton, New Zealand." Transactions of the Institute of British Geographers 34, no. 3 (2009): 333–345.
