= Nuffield Election Studies =

The Nuffield Election Studies are a series of scholarly works on British General Elections that have been published since 1945. The series take their name from Nuffield College, Oxford. R. B. McCallum, who was a fellow at Nuffield discussed the idea of a book capturing the upcoming election after the break-up of the wartime coalition. His colleagues suggested that he should undertake the matter as it was his idea, and so with the help of Alison Readman, a research assistant, they co-authored the first book. David Butler has written extensively in the series.'The British General Election of 2010' by Dennis Kavanagh and Philip Cowley was the first book in the series where neither of the principal authors were based at Nuffield.
