= Maureen Molloy (anthropologist) =

New Zealand anthropologist

- Born: 1949

Academic background
- Education: University of British Columbia, University of British Columbia, University of Auckland
- Theses: Production and reproduction : a critical analysis of the use of 'reproduction' in Marxist literature on the family and the state (1980); Those who speak to the heart: kin and community among the Nova Scotians at Waipu 1850–1916 (1986)

Maureen Anne Molloy is a Canadian–New Zealand anthropologist and author, and is emeritus professor at the University of Auckland. She lectured in women's studies and has studied the Nova Scotian settlement at Waipu. He research focuses on the connections among popular culture and scholarly concepts.

== Academic career ==
Molloy completed a Bachelor of Education at the University of British Columbia, followed by a Master of Arts in 1980, on reproduction in Marxist literature. She then earned a PhD at the University of Auckland, with a thesis titled Those who speak to the heart: kin and community among the Nova Scotians at Waipu 1850–1916. A book resulting from her thesis was published by Dunmore Press. Molloy moved to New Zealand in 1983, and joined the faculty of the University of Auckland first as a lecturer in sociology, and then in Women's Studies. Molloy was later the Director of the Institute for Research on Gender, and was promoted to Professor of Women's Studies in the Department of Anthropology. Molloy retired in 2022 and was awarded the status of emeritus professor at the University of Auckland.

Molloy's research focuses on connections among popular culture, policy contexts, and scholarly concepts. Along with historian Raewyn Dalziel, Molloy interviewed British historian Dorothy Thompson on the subject of women in nineteenth century England, to be released alongside videos of interviews of her husband E. P. Thompson. Molloy wrote the Dictionary of New Zealand Biography article on Norman McLeod, the Scottish minister who led his people to settle at Waipu via Nova Scotia. She has written several other books, including a study on cultural anthropologist Margaret Mead, and more recent work on globalisation and the fashion industry, in collaboration with geographer Wendy Larner.

== Selected works ==
Books

- Molloy, Maureen; Larner, Wendy (2013). Fashioning globalisation: New Zealand design, working women and the cultural economy. Wiley-Blackwell. pp. 200 pages.
- Molloy, Maureen (2008). On Creating a Usable Culture: Margaret Mead and the Emergence of American Cosmopolitanism. University of Hawaii Press. pp. 200 pages.
- Molloy, Maureen (2005). From Z to A: Zizek at the Antipodes. Dunmore Publishing. pp. 1–239.
- Molloy, Maureen (1991). Those who Speak to the Heart The Nova Scotian Scots at Waipu, 1854–1920. Dunmore Press. p. 171 pages. ISBN 978-0864691309.

Journal articles

- Brewis AA; Molloy MA; Sutton DG (1990). "Modeling the prehistoric Maori population". American Journal of Biological Anthropology. 81 (3): 343–356. doi:10.1002/ajpa.1330810304. PMID 2183629. Wikidata Q47344891.
- Maureen Molloy (1999). "Death and the Maiden: The Feminine and the Nation in Recent New Zealand Films". Signs. 25 (1): 153–170. doi:10.1086/495417. Wikidata Q130341369.
- Maureen Molloy (1995). "Imagining (the) Difference: Gender, Ethnicity and Metaphors of Nation". Feminist Review (51): 94. doi:10.2307/1395507. Wikidata Q130341370.
- Maureen Molloy (2004). "Cutting-edge Nostalgia: New Zealand Fashion Design at the New Millennium". Fashion Theory. 8 (4): 477–490. doi:10.2752/136270404778051537. Wikidata Q125229094.
- Larner, Wendy; Maureen Molloy; Alison Goodrum (2007). "Globalization, Cultural Economy, and Not-So-Global Cities: The New Zealand Designer Fashion Industry". Environment and Planning D: Society and Space. 25 (3): 381–400. doi:10.1068/d1103. Wikidata Q130341372.
- Maureen Molloy; Larner, Wendy (2010). "WHO NEEDS CULTURAL INTERMEDIARIES INDEED?: Gendered networks in the designer fashion industry". Journal of Cultural Economy. 3 (3): 361–377. doi:10.1080/17530350.2010.506322. Wikidata Q130341373.
