= Anthony King (political scientist) =

Political scientist (1934-2017)

Anthony King FBA
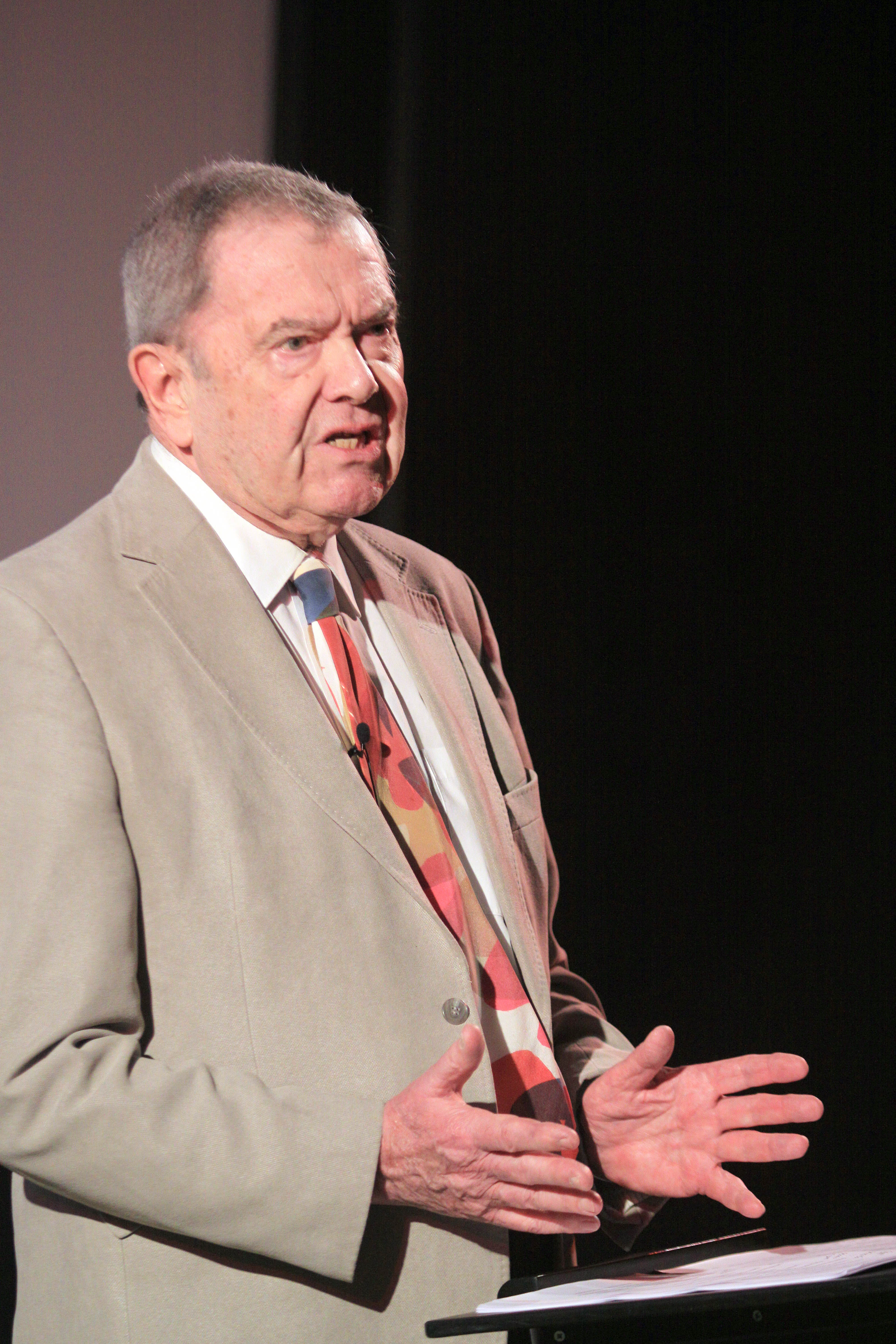
- King giving a talk on "The Blunders of our Governments" at the Essex Book Festival, 2014
- Born: Anthony Stephen King; 17 November 1934; Toronto, Ontario, Canada
- Died: 12 January 2017 (aged 82); Wakes Colne, Essex, England
- Education: Queen's University, Ontario; University of Oxford
- Spouses: Vera Korte (m. 1965; died 1971) Jan Reece (m. 1980)
- Scientific career
- Fields: Government, psephology
- Workplaces: University of Essex
- Thesis: Some aspects of the history of the Liberal Party in Britain, 1906–1914

Anthony Stephen King FBA (17 November 1934 – 12 January 2017) was a Canadian-British professor of government, psephologist and commentator. He taught at the Department of Government at the University of Essex for many years.

== Early life ==
King was born in Toronto on 17 November 1934, the son of Marjorie and Harold King. He gained a B.A. in History and Economics at Queen's University, Ontario. In 1956, he moved to UK as a Rhodes Scholar to study Philosophy, Politics and Economics at the University of Oxford, after which he gained a D.Phil. with thesis titled "Some aspects of the history of the Liberal Party in Britain, 1906–1914".

== Career ==
He initially taught at Magdalen College, Oxford, before transferring to Essex, from which he never officially retired. From 1969, he was Professor of Government at Essex, where he also led a Wednesday brainstorming class of selected bright students from the Department of Government. King taught the course GV100 – Introduction to Politics. He also taught at Princeton and the University of Wisconsin–Madison, in the United States.

He regularly appeared on election results programming and analysed their implications. For each UK General Election from 1983 to 2005, he was BBC television's analyst on their election night programming. On a monthly basis, he analysed political opinion polls on voting intentions for The Daily Telegraph. He also wrote many books on politics and was co-editor of the Britain at the Polls series of essays and, in 2008, The British Constitution.

King was co-author with David Butler of two Nuffield College election studies (those for 1964 and 1966) and author of Britain Says Yes: the 1975 Referendum on the Common Market and Running Scared: Why America's Politicians Campaign Too Much and Govern Too Little. He was also co-author with Ivor Crewe of the semi-official SDP: The Birth, Life and Death of the Social Democratic Party and The Blunders of our Governments. He edited The New American Political System, New Labour Triumphs: Britain at the Polls 1997, Britain at the Polls 2001 and Britain at the Polls 2005.

King was a member of the Committee on Standards in Public Life and the Royal Commission on the Reform of the House of Lords (the Wakeham Commission). In 2010, he was elected as a Fellow of the British Academy. He also served as an associate at the Institute for Government, a non-partisan charity that aims to improve the effectiveness of central Government in the UK. During the latter part of his life, his research focused on: the changing British constitution; the British prime ministership; American politics and government and the history of democracy.

King was also a member of the Academia Europaea, a foreign honorary member of the American Academy of Arts and Sciences, and an honorary life Fellow of the Royal Society of Arts.

== Personal life ==
King married twice. His first wife Vera Korte, whom he married in 1965, died in 1971. He married his second wife Jan Reece in 1980.

King lived at Wakes Colne in Essex. He died at home on 12 January 2017 at the age of 82, from complications of heart surgery.

== Publications ==
- British Members of Parliament: A Self-portrait (1974)
- "The View from Europe" with David Sanders in Charles O. Jones, ed., The Reagan Legacy: Promise and Performance (1988)
- "Margaret Thatcher as a Political Leader" in Robert Skidelsky, ed. Thatcherism. ISBN 0-701-13342-2 (1988)
- Britain at the Polls 1992 (editor)
- The New American Political System. ISBN 0-333-55053-6 (editor) (1990)
- SDP: The Birth, Life and Death of the Social Democratic Party with Ivor Crewe (co-winner of the 1996 W.J.M. Mackenzie Prize awarded by the Political Studies Association for the best book in the field of political science) (1995)
- Running Scared: Why America's Politicians Campaign Too Much and Govern Too Little (1997)
- New Labour Triumphs: Britain at the Polls (editor) (1998)
- The British general election of 1966 with David Butler. ISBN 0-333-77870-7 (1999)
- Does the United Kingdom Still Have a Constitution? ISBN 0-421-74930-X (2001)
- Leaders' Personalities and the Outcomes of Democratic Elections. ISBN 0-198-29791-2 (editor) (2002)
- The British Constitution. ISBN 0-199-23232-6 (2007)
- The Founding Fathers v. the People: Paradoxes of American Democracy. ISBN 978-0674045736 (2012)
- The Blunders of Our Governments with Ivor Crewe. ISBN 1-780-74405-6 (2014)
- Who Governs Britain? ISBN 0-141-98066-4 (2015)

== Sources ==
- Staff Profile: Anthony King – Department of Government – University of Essex
- Who's Who 2007
