= John Ramsden (historian) =

British historian (1947–2009)

John Ramsden (12 November 1947 – 16 October 2009) was Professor of History at Queen Mary, University of London until his retirement in 2008. He was an authority on the history of the Conservative Party.

== Biography ==
Ramsden was born in Sheffield, the son of Cyril Ramsden, who worked for the National Coal Board, and his wife Mary Ramsden. He attended King Edward VII School in 1959–1966, followed by Corpus Christi College, Oxford, where he graduated with a first in modern history.

Ramsden moved to Nuffield College, Oxford to pursue doctoral research on "the organisation of the Conservative Party in Britain 1910–30", under Robert Blake and David Butler. He then joined Queen Mary College, London, as a lecturer in history in January 1972. He remained at Queen Mary for the remainder of his career, being promoted to reader in 1980, and to a personal chair as Professor of Modern History in 1996.

Ramsden was also active in Conservative politics. He was chairman of the Wanstead and Woodford Conservative Association in 1980 and became a Redbridge councillor in 1982.
