= Dennis Kavanagh =

British political analyst and writer

Dennis Kavanagh (born 27 March 1941) is a British political analyst and since 1996 has been Professor of Politics at the University of Liverpool, and now Emeritus Professor. He has written extensively on post-war British politics. With David Butler, he wrote the series of books on British general elections, such as The British General Election of 2010, and most recently, The British General Election of 2015.

== See also ==
- Nuffield Election Studies

== Bibliography ==
- Dennis Kavanagh, Consensus Politics from Attlee to Thatcher (Institute of Contemporary British History, 1989)
- Dennis Kavanagh, Thatcherism and British Politics: The End of Consensus? (Oxford University Press, 1990)
- Dennis Kavanagh, Politics and Personalities (Palgrave Macmillan, 1990)
- Dennis Kavanagh, Political Science and Political Behaviour (Routledge, 1993)
- Dennis Kavanagh, Election Campaigning: The New Marketing of Politics (Blackwell, 1995)
- Dennis Kavanagh, The Reordering of British Politics: Politics After Thatcher (Oxford University Press, 1997)
- Anthony Seldon and Dennis Kavanagh, The Powers Behind the Prime Minister (HarperCollins, 1999, ISBN 0002570866; 2013 ISBN 000739263X)
- Dennis Kavanagh, British Politics: Continuities, Changes and Flamboyant Behaviour (Oxford University Press, 2000)
- Anthony Seldon and Dennis Kavanagh (eds.), The Blair Effect 2001-2005 (Cambridge University Press, 2005)
- Dennis Kavanagh and David Butler, The British General Election of 2005 (Palgrave, 2005)
- Dennis Kavanagh and Philip Cowley, The British General Election of 2010 (Palgrave, 2010)
- Dennis Kavanagh and Philip Cowley, The British General Election of 2015 (Palgrave Macmillan, 2016, ISBN 9781137366115)
- Dennis Kavanagh, Philip Gould: An Unfinished Life (Palgrave Macmillan, 2012)
