= Colin Riordan =

British academic (born 1959)

Colin Riordan CBE FLSW
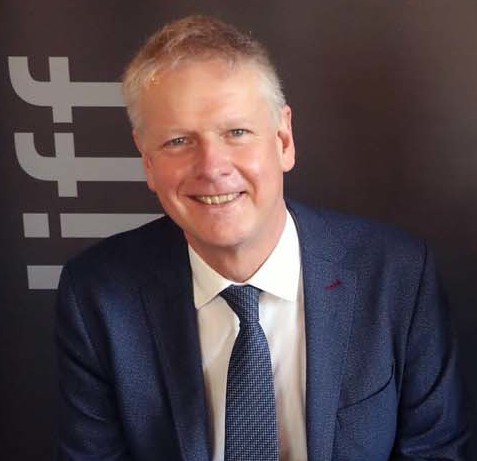
- Professor Riordan in 2019

Vice-Chancellor of Cardiff University
- In office September 2012 – August 2023
- Preceded by: Sir David Grant
- Succeeded by: Wendy Larner

Vice-Chancellor of the University of Essex
- In office October 2007 – 2012
- Preceded by: Sir Ivor Crewe
- Succeeded by: Anthony Forster

Personal details
- Born: 27 July 1959 (age 67) Paderborn, Germany
- Children: 2
- Profession: Academic, Higher Education administrator

Academic background
- Education: Liverpool Collegiate School; University of Manchester (BA, PhD)
- Thesis: Narrative technique in the novels of Uwe Johnson (1986)

Academic work
- Discipline: German language, German studies
- Sub-discipline: Post-war German literature and culture
- Institutions: University College Swansea; Newcastle University; University of Essex; Cardiff University

Colin Bryan Riordan CBE FLSW (born 27 July 1959) is a British academic who was formerly President and Vice-Chancellor of Cardiff University from September 2012 to August 2023.

== Education ==
Riordan was born on 27 July 1959 in Paderborn, West Germany. He was educated at Liverpool Collegiate School before reading German at the University of Manchester. He gained his BA in 1981 and his PhD in 1986.

== Career ==
Riordan taught English as a foreign language at Julius-Maximilians-Universitat Wurzburg in Germany from 1982 to 84. He was Lecturer, then Senior Lecturer in German at Swansea University from 1986 to 1998.

He became Professor of German at Newcastle University in 1998, later being appointed Pro Vice-Chancellor and Provost of the Faculty of Humanities and Social Sciences in August 2005.

In October 2007, he took up the post of Vice-Chancellor at the University of Essex. On 1 September 2012, he became Vice-Chancellor of Cardiff University.

In 2013, he was elected a Fellow of the Learned Society of Wales.

In 2015, under his purview as Vice-Chancellor, Riordan announced that Cardiff University would launch five new flagship research centres, each focusing on a world issue. These include resolving chronic diseases; the scarcity of water; the prevention of crime; studying big data; and creating smarter energy systems.

Riordan was appointed Commander of the Order of the British Empire (CBE) in the 2023 New Year Honours for services to higher education.

It was announced in January 2023 that Riordan would step down as Vice-chancellor of Cardiff University, with his successor Wendy Larner taking up the role from the following academic year.

In February 2024, Riordan was announced as the next chief executive of the Association of Commonwealth Universities, an organisation that represents over 400 universities within the Commonwealth of Nations. In the same year, Riordan was also appointed as a lay council member of Newcastle University, his former institution.

=== Controversies ===
Riordan's tenure at Cardiff University was marked by challenging industrial relations, with multiple rounds of strikes called by staff unions due to issues over pay, pension, and working conditions.

In December 2013, members across three staff unions on campus, University and College Union (UCU), Unison, and Unite, took part in a strike action over the university's pay offer, described by some staff members as "poverty wages". The university was criticised for only offering ordinary staff a 1% pay rise while senior managers had their wages raised by 8%.

In February 2018, another round of industrial action was called by the UCU due to disputes over the Universities Superannuation Scheme (USS) pension scheme. UCU members opposed the proposed changes to the USS pension at the time, which would put academics' pension fund in a more volatile position compared to previously. The same pension dispute led to a further round of strike in November 2019 - the second time in two years. The 2019 strike also cited disputes over salaries, unreasonable workloads, precarious employments (especially by early career academics and doctoral students), and inequalities in salaries such as the gender pay gap. These disputes continued into 2020, with further pickets between February and March. As universities across the UK face financial challenges during the COVID-19 pandemic, industrial relations at Cardiff University under Riordan's leadership remained tense, with staff voting in favour of striking and other types of industrial actions several more times up until the very end of Riordan's tenure in 2023.

Riordan's leadership during these strike actions were criticised by union members as well as the press. While staff and their union argued that academics and other workers face significant real term pay cuts, Riordan's high salary was the subject of much criticism, with Wales Online consistently listing him among the highest earners in Wales. Similarly, Riordan's expenses were under scrutiny during this time. His reported expenses of "£26,000 on oversea trips in five months" (according to The Tab) and "£21k on air fares and £6k on hotels" (according to Wales Online) were deemed unjustifiable, especially in light of Riordan's previous comments highlighting his concerns over Cardiff University's financial position. Riordan's high salary and expense bills were a marked contrast to the financial precarities faced by his employees on strike over the years.

Under Riordan's leadership, Cardiff University was also condemned for punitive actions against striking staff members. In particular, staff who took part in the 2023 marking and assessment boycott (a form of industrial actions) were threatened with a 50-100% pay cut. This move was condemned by Professor Tom Bartlett, who called the pay deduction "ethically questionable" in his letter of resignation from his honorary professorship at the university, addressed to Riordan himself.

== Research and publications ==
He has published on post-war German literature and culture, including editing books on the writers Jurek Becker, Uwe Johnson and Peter Schneider.

== Personal life ==
In November 2017, shortly after missing Bisexual Visibility Day, Riordan came out as bisexual in a monthly email to staff. The BBC quoted him as saying, "Only a few vice chancellors have spoken out about being gay or lesbian and none about being bi, as far as I'm aware." He has two daughters from a former marriage.

== Memberships ==
- Vice-president and board member of Universities UK
- Board member of the Leadership Foundation for Higher Education
- Trustee, the Edge Foundation
- Member of UK NARIC Advisory Council
- Member of UCAS board of trustees
- Board member of the Equality Challenge Unit
- Chair, Universities UK International (UUKi)
- Member of the International Education Council, part of the Department of Business, Innovation and Skills
- Chair of the International Policy Network of Universities UK

In 2013 he became chair of Higher Education Wales, the body which represents the interests of Higher Education Institutions in Wales.

== Bibliography ==
- Riordan, Colin. 1989. The Ethics of Narration: Uwe Johnson's Novels from Ingrid Babendererde to Jahrestage, MHRA Texts and Dissertations, Volume 28 (MHRA). ISBN 978-1-839546-65-5

Academic offices
Preceded by Sir Ivor Crewe	Vice-Chancellor of the University of Essex; 2007–2012	Succeeded by Anthony Forster
Preceded by David Grant	Vice-Chancellor of Cardiff University; 2012–2023	Succeeded by Wendy Larner
