= Donald W. Meinig =

American geographer (1924–2020)

- Born: November 1, 1924; Palouse, Washington, U.S.
- Died: June 13, 2020 (aged 95); Syracuse, New York, U.S.
- Citizenship: American
- Education: Georgetown University; University of Washington
- Spouse: Lee Meinig
- Children: 3
- Awards: Charles P. Daly Medal (1986); Fellow of the National Endowment for the Humanities; Fellow of American Academy of Arts and Sciences (2010); Fulbright Scholar (1958); Guggenheim Fellow; Charles Homer Haskins Prize Lecture (1992)
- Scientific career
- Fields: Geography
- Workplaces: Syracuse University
- Theses: Environment and Settlement in the Palouse, 1868-1910 (1950); Walla Walla Country: 1805-1910. A Century of Man and the Land (1953)
- Doctoral advisor: Howard H. Martin,
- Other academic advisors: Graham H. Lawton
- Doctoral students: Evelyn Stokes

Donald William Meinig (November 1, 1924 – June 13, 2020) was an American geographer. He was Maxwell Research Professor Emeritus of Geography at the Maxwell School of Citizenship and Public Affairs, Syracuse University.

== Career ==
Meinig studied foreign service at Georgetown University, and then earned graduate degrees in geography from the University of Washington in 1950 and 1953, under the supervision of Howard H. Martin; he was also strongly influenced by historian Carroll Quigley and Australian geographer Graham H. Lawton.

Starting in 1950, Meinig held a faculty position at the University of Utah. However, in 1958 he left Utah for a visiting position at the University of Adelaide in Australia, under a Fulbright scholarship, and in 1960 he joined the Syracuse faculty. Between 1968 and 1973, he served as chair of the Geography Department and helped to shape the university's Maxwell School of Citizenship and Public Affairs, becoming a Maxwell Research Professor of Geography in 1990. He retired in 2004 after 46 years on the Maxwell faculty.

At Syracuse, Meinig was the doctoral advisor of more than 20 graduate students, including New Zealand geographer Evelyn Stokes.

=== Research ===
Meinig's work focuses on historical geography, regional geography, cultural geography, social geography, and landscape interpretation. Even after relocating to Upstate New York, his historical geography work reflected western American interests, with pioneering regional studies on the Mormon culture area (1965), Texas (1969), and the Southwest (1971), as well as three chapters on New York State's historical geography in a volume edited by John Thompson (1966).

His most ambitious and well known work is the four volume series "The Shaping of America" (published 1986, 1993, 1998, and 2004), published by the Yale University Press. Meinig dedicated 25 years of his academic career to this research, which offers a detailed overview of the country's geographic development from Columbus' arrival to the year 2000. He also concentrated on literary spaces and geography, stating, "Literature is a valuable storehouse of vivid depictions of the landscapes and lives of modern day society."

Thanks to a collaboration with his former doctoral student John Garver, some of Meinig's thematic regional maps named "The Making of America" were published by the National Geographic Society in the 1980s, reaching more than 10 million National Geographic subscribers.

== Awards and honors ==
Meinig was a Fulbright Scholar, a Guggenheim Fellow, and a Fellow of the National Endowment for the Humanities. He was the first American geographer to be elected as a corresponding Fellow of the British Academy, in 1991. In 1965 the Association of American Geographers awarded him a citation "For Meritorious Contribution to the Field of Geography," and the American Geographical Society gave him their Charles P. Daly Medal in 1986. Meinig received an honorary doctorate (D.H.L.) from the Maxwell School at Syracuse University in 1994. In 2004, he received the John Brinckerhoff Jackson Prize for the best book interpreting the geography of America. The Geographical Review devoted a special issue to him in July 2009. In 2010, he was elected as a member of the American Academy of Arts and Sciences.

== Personal life ==
Meinig was born on November 1, 1924, in Palouse, Washington, and was raised on a farm. He self-identified as Anglo-Saxon of German and British ancestry. Meinig enlisted in the Army in May 1943 and served in the Corps of Engineers. In August 1944, he was promoted to 2nd Lieutenant and honorably discharged from active duty in February 1946.

Meinig died at Syracuse, New York, on June 13, 2020, at the age of 95.

== Books ==
His principal publications include:

- The Shaping of America: A Geographical Perspective on 500 Years of History, Volume 4: Global America, 1915-2000 (New Haven, Yale University Press, 2004).
- The Shaping of America: A Geographical Perspective on 500 Years of History, Volume 3: Transcontinental America, 1850-1915 (New Haven, Yale University Press, 1995).
- The Shaping of America: A Geographical Perspective on 500 Years of History, Volume 2, Continental America, 1800-1867 (New Haven, Yale University Press, 1992).
- The Shaping of America: A Geographical Perspective on 500 Years of History, Volume 1, Atlantic America, 1492-1800 (New Haven, Yale University Press, 1986).
- (Editor, with John Brinckerhoff Jackson) The Interpretation of Ordinary Landscapes (New York, Oxford University Press, 1979).
- Southwest: Three Peoples in Geographical Change 1600-1970 (New York, Oxford University Press, 1971).
- Imperial Texas, An Interpretative Essay in Cultural Geography (Austin, University of Texas Press, 1969).
- The Great Columbia Plain, A Historical Geography, 1805- 1910 (Seattle, University of Washington Press, 1968).
- On the Margins of the Good Earth: The South Australian Wheat Frontier, 1869–84 (London: John Murray, 1962)
- The Interpretation of Ordinary Landscapes (New York, Oxford University Press, 1979)
