= David Butler (psephologist) =

English political scientist (1924–2022)

Sir David Butler CBE FBA
- Born: 17 October 1924; London, England
- Died: 8 November 2022 (aged 98); Oxford, England
- Known for: Psephology
- Spouse: Marilyn Evans (m. 1962; died 2014)
- Children: 3
- Awards: Knight Bachelor (2011)

Sir David Edgeworth Butler CBE FBA (17 October 1924 – 8 November 2022) was an English political scientist who specialised in psephology, the study of elections. He has been described as "the father of modern election science".

== Early life and education ==
Born in Bloomsbury, London on 17 October 1924, Butler was the son of Harold Edgeworth Butler, Professor of Latin at University College, London by his wife, Margaret, née Pollard. Through his mother, he was the grandson of the historian A. F. Pollard. The politician R. A. Butler was a second cousin.

Butler was educated at St Paul's School and New College, Oxford. His time at Oxford was interrupted by the Second World War, during which he saw service as a tank commander in the Staffordshire Yeomanry and crossed the Rhine during the latter stages of the war. After the war, he resumed his studies at Oxford, then proceeded to Princeton University as a Jane Eliza Procter Visiting Fellow from 1947 to 1948. He returned to Oxford as a researcher and academic at Nuffield College, where he taught throughout the remainder of his academic career.

== Career ==
Between 1956 and 1957, Butler served as personal assistant to the British Ambassador to the United States.

Butler was the author of many publications, but his most notable work is the series of Nuffield Election Studies which covers every United Kingdom General Election since 1945. Early co-authors included Richard Rose and Anthony King. From 1974 to 2005, the series was co-authored with Dennis Kavanagh. Butler was a commentator on the BBC's election night coverage from the 1950 election to the 1979 election, and was a co-inventor of the swingometer. He later appeared as an electoral analyst on various television and radio programmes, including for ITV on the night of the 1997 general election, and Sky News election night coverage in 2001. He also appeared as a guest on the BBC's coverage of both the 2010 and 2015 general elections.

His book, Political Change in Britain: Forces Shaping Electoral Choice (Macmillan, 1969), written with US political scientist Donald E. Stokes, brought modern American science treatments to the United Kingdom. His Governing Without a Majority: Dilemmas for Hung Parliaments in Britain (Sheridan House, 1986) provides an analysis of the phenomenon of the hung parliament in Britain. He sat on the editorial board of the academic journal Representation.

After 1973, Butler was involved in founding and organising the Oxford University Australian Politics Lunch, which "has only one rule, you are not allowed to talk about anything except Australian politics." Notable lunch attendees included the Australian Leader of the Opposition Kim Beazley.

== Personal life and death ==
Butler was married to Professor Marilyn Butler (died March 2014), a rector of Exeter College, Oxford, the first woman to head a previously all-male college. They had three sons. Butler lived in Oxford. The Conservative politician Rab Butler was his cousin.

Butler died of acute kidney failure at Sobell House hospice in Oxford, on 8 November 2022, aged 98, 3 weeks after his 98th birthday.

== Honours ==
Butler was an Emeritus Fellow of Nuffield College, Oxford. He was elected a Fellow of the British Academy (FBA) in 1994. He was appointed Commander of the Order of the British Empire (CBE) in the 1991 Queen's Birthday Honours List and knighted in the 2011 New Years Honours List for services to political science. Butler was awarded an honorary doctorate from the University of Essex in 1993.

== Bibliography ==
=== Books on British politics ===
- D. E. Butler, The Electoral System in Britain 1918–1951 (Oxford: Oxford University Press, 1953).
- ——— The Electoral System in Britain Since 1918, 2nd ed. (Oxford: Oxford University Press, 1963).
- D. E. Butler, The Study of Political Behaviour (London: Hutchinson, 1958).
- ——— The Study of Political Behaviour, 2nd ed. (London: Hutchinson, 1959).
- David Butler and Donald Stokes, Political Change in Britain: Forces Shaping Electoral Choice (London: Macmillan, 1969).
- ——— Political Change in Britain: The Basis of Electoral Choice, 2nd ed. (London: Macmillan, 1975).
- David Butler (ed.), Coalitions in British Politics (London: Macmillan, 1978).
- David Butler and A. H. Halsey (eds), Policy and Politics: Essays in Honour of Norman Chester (London: Macmillan, 1978).
- David Butler, Governing Without a Majority: Dilemmas for Hung Parliaments in Britain (London: Collins, 1983).
- ——— Governing Without a Majority: Dilemmas for Hung Parliaments in Britain, Second Edition (Basingstoke: Palgrave Macmillan, 1986).
- David Butler, British General Elections Since 1945 – 'Making Contemporary Britain' Series (Oxford: Basil Blackwell, 1989).
- ——— British General Elections Since 1945, Second Edition – 'Making Contemporary Britain' Series (Chichester: John Wiley & Sons, 1995).
- David Butler, Andrew Adonis and Tony Travers, Failure in British Government: The Politics of the Poll Tax (Oxford: Oxford University Press, 1994).
- David Butler, Vernon Bogdanor and Robert Summer (eds), The Law, Politics and the Constitution: Essays in Honor of Geoffrey Marshall (Oxford: Oxford University Press, 1999).

=== Books on international politics ===
==== Comparative international studies ====
- D. E. Butler (ed.), Elections Abroad, 1957–1958 (London: Macmillan, 1959).
- Vernon Bogdanor and David Butler (eds), Democracy and Elections: Electoral Systems and Their Political Consequences (Cambridge: Cambridge University Press,1983).
- David Butler and D. A. Low (eds), Sovereigns and Surrogates: Constitutional Heads of State in the Commonwealth (London: Macmillan, 1991).
- David Butler and Iain Maclean, Fixing the Boundaries: Defining and Redefining Single-Member Electoral Districts (Aldershot: Dartmouth Publishing, 1996).

==== Books on American politics ====
- David Butler and Bruce Cain, Congressional Redistricting: Comparative and Theoretical Frameworks (New York: Macmillan, 1992).

==== Books on Australian politics ====
- David Butler, The Canberra Model: Essays on Australian Government (Toronto: Macmillan of Canada, 1974).

==== Books on Indian politics ====
- David Butler, Ashok Lahiri and Prannoy Roy, A Compendium of Indian Elections (New Delhi: Arnold-Heinemann, 1984).
- David Butler, Ashok Lahiri and Prannoy Roy (eds), India Decides: Elections 1952–1989 (New Delhi: Living Media India, 1990).
- ——— India Decides: Elections 1952–1991, 2nd ed. (New Delhi: Living Media India, 1991).
- ——— India Decides: Elections 1952–1995, 3rd ed. (New Delhi: Books and Things, 1996).

=== Nuffield Election Studies ===
==== Nuffield Studies: British General Elections ====
(Only the volumes edited or co-edited by Butler are listed here; the first two volumes, for the elections of 1945 and 1950, had Butler as a contributor, but were edited by others; since 2010, the series has been edited by others.)

- D.E. Butler, The British General Election of 1951 (London: Macmillan, 1952).
- D.E. Butler, The British General Election of 1955 (London: Macmillan, 1955).
- D.E. Butler and Richard Rose, The British General Election of 1959 (London: Macmillan, 1960).
- D.E. Butler and Anthony King, The British General Election of 1964 (London: Macmillan,1965).
- ——— The British General Election of 1966 (London: Macmillan,1966).
- David Butler and Michael Pinto-Duschinsky, The British General Election of 1970 (London: Macmillan, 1971).
- David Butler and Dennis Kavanagh, The British General Election of February, 1974 (London: Macmillan, 1974).
- ——— The British General Election of October, 1974 (London: Macmillan, 1975).
- ——— The British General Election of 1979 (London: Macmillan, 1979).
- ——— The British General Election of 1983 (London: Macmillan, 1984).
- ——— The British General Election of 1987 (Basingstoke: Palgrave Macmillan, 1988).
- ——— The British General Election of 1992 (Basingstoke: Palgrave Macmillan, 1992).
- ——— The British General Election of 1997 (Basingstoke: Palgrave Macmillan, 1997).
- ——— The British General Election of 2001 (Basingstoke: Palgrave Macmillan, 2001).
- Dennis Kavanagh and David Butler, The British General Election of 2005 (Basingstoke: Palgrave Macmillan, 2005).

==== Nuffield Study: 1975 EEC Referendum ====
- David Butler and Uwe W. Kitzinger, The 1975 Referendum (London: Macmillan, 1976).

==== Nuffield Studies: European Elections ====
(No book on the 1989 European elections was produced, due to Butler being in America for much of the early part of 1989. Unlike the 'British General Election' series, which had Editors before and after Butler, the European election series started with Butler, and was not continued thereafter, beyond the volume on the 2004 election.)

- David Butler and David Marquand, British Politics and European Elections (London: Longman, 1981).
- David Butler and Paul Jowett, Party Strategies in Britain: A Study of the 1984 European Elections (Basingstoke: Palgrave Macmillan, 1985).
- David Butler and Martin Westlake, British Politics and European Elections, 1994 (Basingstoke: Palgrave Macmillan, 1995).
- ——— British Politics and European Elections, 1999 (Basingstoke: Palgrave Macmillan, 2000).
- ——— British Politics and European Elections, 2004 (Basingstoke: Palgrave Macmillan, 2005).

=== British Political Facts series ===
- David Butler and Jennie Freeman, British Political Facts, 1900–1960 (London: Macmillan, 1963).
- ——— British Political Facts, 1900–1967, 2nd ed (London: Macmillan, 1968).
- ——— British Political Facts, 1900–1968, 3rd ed. (London: Macmillan, 1969).
- David Butler and Anne Sloman, British Political Facts, 1900–1975, 4th ed. (London: Macmillan, 1975).
- ——— British Political Facts, 1900–1979, 5th ed. (London: Macmillan, 1980).
- David Butler and Gareth Butler, British Political Facts, 1900–1985, 6th ed. (Basingstoke: Palgrave Macmillan, 1986).
- ——— British Political Facts, 1900–1994, 7th ed. (Basingstoke: Palgrave Macmillan, 1994).
- ——— Twentieth-Century British Political Facts, 1900–2000, 8th ed. (Basingstoke: Palgrave Macmillan, 2000).
- ——— British Political Facts Since 1979, 9th ed.(Basingstoke: Palgrave Macmillan, 2006).
- ——— British Political Facts, 10th ed. (Basingstoke: Palgrave Macmillan, 2011).

(Subsequent editions since the 11th edition in 2018 have been edited by Roger Mortimore and Andrew Blick, and have been renamed Butler's British Political Facts.)

=== American Enterprise Institute At the Polls comparative studies series ===
(Please note that only the volumes co-edited by Butler are listed here.)

- David Butler and Austin Ranney (eds), Referendums: A Comparative Study of Practice and Theory (Washington D.C.: AEI Press, 1978).
- David Butler, Howard R. Penniman and Austin Ranney (eds), Democracy at the Polls: A Comparative Study of Competitive National Elections (Washington D.C.: AEI Press, 1981).
- David Butler and Austin Ranney (eds), Electioneering: A Comparative Study of Continuity and Change (Oxford: Oxford University Press, 1992).
- ——— Referendums Around the World: The Growing Use of Direct Democracy (Basingstoke: Macmillan, 1994).

=== Book chapters ===
- D.E. Butler, 'Appendix III: The Relation of Seats to Votes', in R. B. McCallum and Alison Readman (eds), The British General Election of 1945 (Oxford: Oxford University Press, 1947), pp. 277–92.
- ——— 'Appendix: An Examination of the Results', H. G. Nicholas (ed.), The British General Election of 1950 (London: Macmillan, 1951), pp. 306–33.
- Anonymous, 'Section III, Foreign History, Chapter II: The United States of America', in The Annual Register: A Review of Public Events at Home and Abroad for the Year 1952, Vol. 194 (London: Longman, 1953), pp. 176–93.
- ——— 'Section III, Foreign History, Chapter II: The United States of America', in The Annual Register: A Review of Public Events at Home and Abroad for the Year 1953, Vol. 195 (London: Longman, 1954), pp. 160–74.
- ——— 'Section III, Foreign History, Chapter II: The United States of America', in The Annual Register: A Review of Public Events at Home and Abroad for the Year 1954, Vol. 196 (London: Longman, 1955), pp. 168–86.
- David Butler, 'The Study of British Elections', in J. S. Bromley and E. H. Kossmann (eds), Britain and the Netherlands: Papers Delivered to the Oxford-Netherlands Historical Conference, 1959 (London: Chatto & Windus, 1960), pp. 221–30.
- David E. Butler, 'The Study of Political Behaviour in Britain', in Austin Ranney (ed.), Essays on the Behavioral Study of Politics (Urbana, Illinois: University of Illinois Press, 1962), pp. 209–16.
- David Butler, 'Thoughts on the 1972 Election', in Henry Mayer (ed.), Labor to Power: Australia's 1972 Election (Sydney, New South Wales: Angus & Robertson on behalf of the Australasian Political Studies Association, 1973), pp. 1–5.
- ——— 'By-Elections and Their Interpretation', in Chris Cook and John Ramsden (eds), By-Elections in British Politics (London: Macmillan, 1973), pp. 1–12.
- ——— 'By-Elections and Their Interpretation', in Chris Cook and John Ramsden (eds), By-Elections in British Politics: Revised Second Edition (London: Routledge, 1997), pp. 1–12.
- ——— 'Survey of the Voting: Election of Haves and Have-Nots', in Times Guide to the House of Commons, June 1987 (London: The Times, 1987), pp. 254–56.
- ——— 'Preface', Victor Lal, Fiji: Coups in Paradise – Race, Politics and Military Intervention (Ann Arbor, Michigan: Zed Books, 1990), pp. 1–10.
- ——— 'Elections in Britain', in Peter Catterall (ed.), Contemporary Britain: An Annual Review, 1991 (London: Institute of Contemporary British History, 1991), pp. 59–63.
- ——— 'The Presidency and American Constitutionalism', in Kenneth W. Thompson (ed.), The American Presidency: Perspectives from Abroad, Volume III (Lanham, Virginia: The Miller Centre, University of Virginia, 1992).
- ——— 'Voting Behaviour and the Party System', in Bill Jones and Lynton Robins (eds), Two Decades in British Politics: Essays to Mark Twenty-one Years of the Politics Association, 1969–90 (Manchester: Manchester University Press, 1992).
- ——— 'The Republican Question in Australia', in Kate Darian-Smith (ed.), Public Lectures in Australian Studies (London: Institute of Commonwealth Studies, 1994), pp. 1–15.
- ——— 'Polls and Elections', in Lawrence LeDuc, Richard G. Niemi and Pippa Norris (eds), Comparing Discrepancies: Elections and Voting in Global Perspective (Thousand Oaks, California: Sage, 1996), pp. 236–53.
- ——— 'Putting Turnout into Perspective', in Virginia Gibbons (ed.), The People Have Spoken – UK Elections: Who Votes and Who Doesn't (London: Hansard Society, 2001), pp. 11–13.
- ——— 'Foreword', in Dennis Kavanagh and Philip Cowley (eds), The British General Election of 2010 (Basingstoke: Palgrave Macmillan, 2010), pp. xiii–xiv.

(Butler also anonymously wrote various analytical chapters of the 'Times Guide to the House of Commons' series from the 1960s to the 1980s.)

=== Peer-reviewed articles ===
- David Butler, 'Trends in British By-Elections', Journal of Politics, Vol. 11, No. 2 (May 1949), pp. 396–407.
- ——— 'Convention and Conference', Cambridge Journal, Vol. IV, No. 4 (January 1951), pp. 195–206.
- ——— 'La Relation entre les Sièges Obtenus et les Voix Recueillies par les Partis dans les Elections Britanniques', Revue française de science politique, Vol. 2, No. 2 (Avril-Juin 1952), pp. 265–69.
- ——— 'Voting Behaviour and its Study in Britain', British Journal of Sociology, Vol. VI, No. 2 (June 1955), pp. 93–103.
- ——— 'Counting the Votes: Some Comments', British Journal of Sociology, Vol. VI, No. 2 (June 1955), pp. 155–57.
- ——— 'Some Recent Studies of Voting: Three Styles in Psephology', Political Studies, Vol. III, No. 2 (June 1955), pp. 143–47.
- ——— 'An Englishman's Reflections on the Change of Administration', American Scholar, Vol. 30, No. 4 (Autumn 1961), pp. 517–27.
- ——— 'A Comment on Professor Rasmussen's Article', Parliamentary Affairs, Vol. XVII, No. 4 (1965), pp. 455–57.
- Michael Kahan, David Butler and Donald Stokes, 'On the Analytical Division of Social Class', British Journal of Sociology, Vol. XVII, No. 2 (June 1966), pp. 122–32.
- David Butler, 'Instant History,' New Zealand Journal of History, Vol, 2, No. 2 (1968), pp. 107–14.
- ——— 'Some Thoughts on Ministerial Responsibility—The VIP Planes Affair', Australian Quarterly, Vol. 39, No. 4 (December 1967), pp. 36–40.
- ——— 'The Electoral Advantage of Being in Power', Politics, Vol. 3, No. 1 (1968), pp. 16–20.
- David Butler, Arthur Stevens and Donald Stokes, 'The Strength of the Liberals Under Different Electoral Systems', Parliamentary Affairs, Vol. 22, Issue 1 (Winter 1968), pp. 10–15.
- ——— 'Thoughts on the 1972 Election', Politics, Vol. 8, Issue 1 (May 1973), pp. 1–5.
- ——— 'Ministerial Responsibility in Australia and Britain', Parliamentary Affairs, Vol. 26, Issue 2 (June 1973), pp. 403–14.
- ——— 'The Australian Crisis of 1975', Parliamentary Affairs, Vol. 29, Issue 9 (1975), pp. 201–10.
- ——— 'Politics and the Constitution: 20 Questions Left by Remembrance Day', Current Affairs Bulletin, Vol. 52, No. 10 (March 1976).
- ——— 'The Renomination of M.P.s: A Note', Parliamentary Affairs, Vol. 31, Issue 2 (Spring 1978), pp. 210–12.
- Stuart, N. L. Webb, and D. Butler, 'Public Opinion Polls (with Discussion)', Journal of the Royal Statistical Society, Vol. 142, Part 4 (1979), pp. 443–67.
- David Butler, 'British General Elections', SSRC Newsletter: Social Science Research Council, 50 (November 1983).
- ——— 'Philip Williams', PS: Political Science & Politics, Vol. 18, Issue 2 (March 1985), pp. 294–95.
- ——— 'India's Winter Election', Representation, Vol. 25, Issue 98 (March 1985), pp. 1–2.
- David Butler and Bruce E. Cain, 'Reapportionment: A Study in Comparative Government', Electoral Studies, Vol. 4, No. 3 (1985), pp. 197–213.
- David Butler, 'The Benn Archive', Contemporary Record, Vol. 1, Issue 1 (March 1987), pp. 13–14
- ——— 'General Elections Since 1945', Contemporary Record, Vol. 3, Issue 1 (September 1989), pp. 18–19.
- David Butler and Stephen D. Van Beek, 'Why Not Swing? Measuring Electoral Change', PS: Political Science and Politics, Vol. 23, No. 2 (June 1990), pp. 178–84.
- Clive Bean and David Butler, 'Uniformity in Australian Electoral Patterns: The 1990 Federal Election in Perspective', Australian Journal of Political Science, Vol. 26, Issue 1 (March 1991), pp. 127–36.
- ——— 'Variability and Uniformity: A Response', Australian Journal of Political Science, Vol. 26, Issue 2 (July 1991), pp. 348–52.
- David Butler, 'The Redrawing of Parliamentary Boundaries in Britain', British Elections and Parties Yearbook, Vol. 2, Issue 1 (January 1992), pp. 5–12.
- David Butler and Roger Mortimore, 'A Level Playing-Field for British Elections?', Parliamentary Affairs, Vol. 45, Issue 2 (1992), pp. 153–63.
- David Butler, 'The Plant Report 1993: The Third Report of Labour's Working Party on Electoral Systems', Representation, Vol. 31, Issue 116 (June 1993), pp. 77–79.
- ——— 'The Legacy of Stephen King-Hall', Parliamentary Affairs, Vol. 47, Issue 4 (1994), pp. 498–500.
- Robert Hazell, Nicole Smith, James Cornford and David Butler, 'Reforming the Constitution: The Work of the Constitution Unit', RSA Journal, Vol. 144, No. 5475 (December 1996), pp. 41–50.
- David Butler, 'Notes on Recent Elections: Australia', Electoral Studies, Vol. 18, No. 3 (1999), pp. 411–14.
- David Butler, Chris Lawrence‐Pietroni, Stephen Twigg and Philip Norton, 'Roundtable on the Wakeham Report', Representation, Vol. 37, Issue 2 (September 2000), pp. 99–106.
- David Butler and Sarah Butt, 'Seats and Votes: A Comment', Representation, Vol. 40, Issue 3, (January 2004), pp. 169–72.
- David Butler, 'Reflections on Parliamentary Democracy', Parliamentary Affairs, Vol. 57, Issue 4 (2004), pp. 734–43.

(Butler was also the founding co-Editor of the peer-reviewed academic journal 'Electoral Studies', from 1982 to 1992.)

=== Books on Butler ===
- Dennis Kavanagh, 'David Butler', in Dennis Kavanagh (ed.), Electoral Politics: Essays to Mark the Retirement of David Butler (Oxford: Clarendon Press, 1992).
- Michael Crick, Sultan of Swing: The Life of David Butler (London: Biteback, 2018).
