= Robyn Longhurst =

New Zealand geographer

Robyn Longhurst FRSNZ
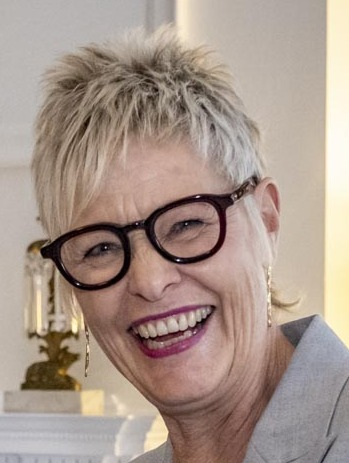
- Longhurst in 2023
- Citizenship: New Zealand
- Education: University of Waikato
- Awards: 2018 Elected as Fellow of Te Apārangi Royal Society of New Zealand 2018 Awarded International Geographical Union Lauréat d’honneur 2012 Jan Monk Service Award by the Association of American Geographers
- Scientific career
- Fields: Human geography
- Workplaces: University of Waikato Te Herenga Waka - Victoria University of Wellington
- Thesis: Geographies that matter: Pregnant bodies in public places (1996)
- Doctoral advisor: Richard Bedford; Evelyn Stokes
- Doctoral students: Lynda Johnston
- Other notable students: Angeline Greensill

Robyn Longhurst FRSNZ is a New Zealand human geography academician. In 2006 she was appointed full professor at the University of Waikato. In 2015 at Waikato she took up the role of Deputy Vice-Chancellor (Academic). In 2024 she took up the same role at Te Herenga Waka—Victoria University of Wellington.

== Academic career ==
After a 1996 PhD titled 'Geographies that matter: Pregnant bodies in public places' at the University of Waikato, Longhurst joined the staff, rising to full professor. Notable students include Lynda Johnston and Angeline Greensill.

In 2018 Longhurst was elected a Fellow of the Royal Society of New Zealand.

== Selected works ==
- Longhurst, Robyn. "Semi-structured interviews and focus groups." Key methods in geography 3 (2003): 143–156.
- Longhurst, Robyn. Bodies: Exploring fluid boundaries. Routledge, 2004.
- Johnston, Lynda, and Robyn Longhurst. Space, place, and sex: Geographies of sexualities. Rowman & Littlefield, 2009.
- Longhurst, Robyn, Elsie Ho, and Lynda Johnston. "Using 'the body’as an 'instrument of research': kimch’i and pavlova." Area 40, no. 2 (2008): 208–217.
- Longhurst, Robyn. "VIEWPOINT The body and geography." Gender, Place & Culture 2, no. 1 (1995): 97–106.
