= Robin Peace =

New Zealander social scientist

Robin Peace CRSNZ
- Education: University of Waikato
- Scientific career
- Fields: Social science
- Workplaces: Massey University
- Thesis: Surface tension: Place/poverty/policy: From "poverty" to "social exclusion": Implications of discursive shifts in European Union poverty policy, 1975-1999 (1999)
- Doctoral advisor: Richard Bedford, Catherine Kingfisher
- Doctoral students: Lynda Johnston

Robin Peace CRSNZ is a social scientist from New Zealand. In 2018 she was appointed a Companion of the Royal Society Te Apārangi for her contribution to the promotion and advancement of the social sciences in New Zealand.

== Life ==
Peace completed a PhD at the University of Waikato in 1999, titled Surface tension: Place/poverty/policy: From "poverty" to "social exclusion": Implications of discursive shifts in European Union poverty policy, 1975-1999.

In 2006 Peace joined Massey University's College of Humanities and Social Sciences. She is the director of eSocSci, Hui Rangahou Tahi, New Zealand's national e-network of social scientists. She is a leader for the Aotearoa New Zealand Evaluation Association, which educates evaluators. Notable students include Lynda Johnston.

Peace has served on a number of committees concerned with the social sciences, including the New Zealand National Commission for UNESCO, the Marsden Fund's Social Sciences Panel, the Rutherford Discovery Fellowship panel, and has represented the Royal Society Te Apārangi on the International Social Science Council, and the working group that developed the International Science Council.
