= Patrick Nairne =

Sir Patrick Nairne
- Born: 15 August 1921
- Died: 4 June 2013 (aged 91)
- Education: Radley College; University College, Oxford
- Occupation: Civil Servant
- Spouse: Penelope Chauncy Bridges (1948–2014)

Sir Patrick Dalmahoy Nairne, GCB MC PC (15 August 1921 – 4 June 2013) was a senior British civil servant. His career started in the Admiralty. He eventually became Permanent Secretary of the Department of Health and Social Security and Master of St Catherine's College, Oxford (1981–88). Nairne was a member of the Privy Council of the United Kingdom, appointed in 1982 when he became a member of Lord Franks' official inquiry into the Falklands War, and a governor of the Ditchley Foundation. He was Chancellor of the University of Essex from 1982 to 1997. He was an Honorary Fellow of University College, Oxford. Nairne was the first Chair of the Nuffield Council on Bioethics from 1991 to 1996.

Nairne was appointed a Companion of the Order of the Bath (CB) in the 1971 Birthday Honours, promoted to Knight Commander of the Order (KCB) in the 1975 Birthday Honours, and to Knight Grand Cross of the Order (GCB) in the 1981 Birthday Honours.

== Family ==
Nairne's six children include Sandy Nairne, Director of the National Portrait Gallery, and Andrew Nairne, Director of Kettle's Yard, Cambridge.

Government offices
Preceded by Sir John Hunt	Second Permanent Secretary at the Cabinet Office; 1973–1975	Succeeded by Sir Roy Denman
Preceded by Sir Philip Rogers	Permanent Secretary of the Department of Health and Social Security; 1975–1981	Succeeded by Sir Kenneth Stowe
Academic offices
Preceded by Alan Bullock	Master of St Catherine's College, Oxford; 1981–1988	Succeeded by Sir Brian Smith
Preceded by Rab Butler	Chancellor of the University of Essex; 1982–1997	Succeeded by Michael Nolan
