= Brian Smith (chemist) =

British chemist and vice-chancellor

Professor Sir Brian Smith CBE FREng FLSW FIET CEng
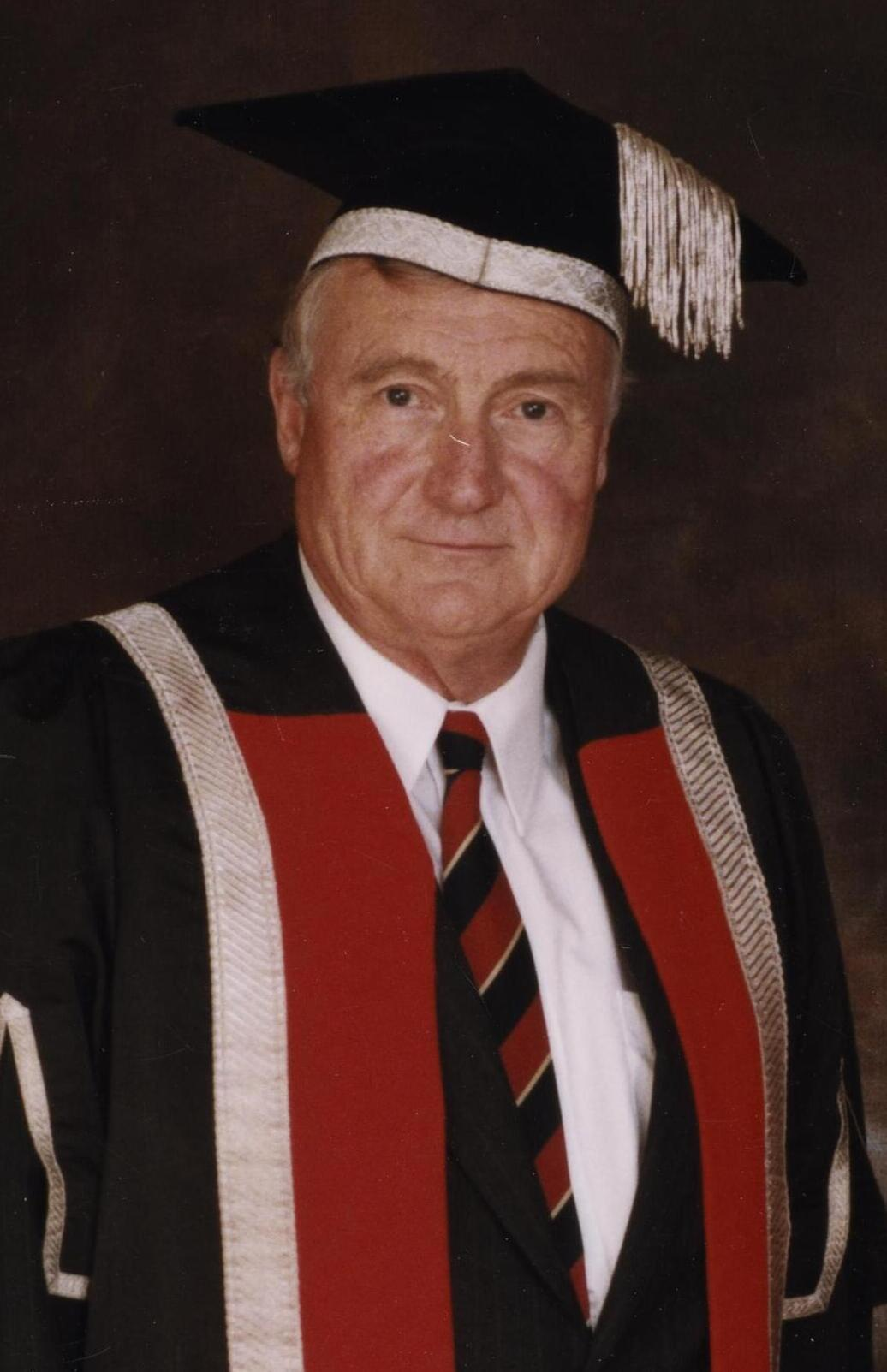
- Sir Brian Smith in 1998

Vice-Chancellor of Cardiff University
- In office 1993–2001
- Preceded by: Sir Aubrey Trotman-Dickenson
- Succeeded by: Sir David Grant

Master of St Catherine's College, Oxford
- In office 1988–1994
- Preceded by: Sir Patrick Nairne
- Succeeded by: Raymond Plant

Personal details
- Born: Eric Brian Smith; 10 October 1933 North Wales
- Died: 17 May 2023 (aged 89) Oxfordshire
- Spouse(s): Margaret A. Barr (m. 1957–1977) Regina, Lady Smith
- Children: 3

Academic background
- Education: Wirral Grammar School for Boys
- Alma mater: University of Liverpool (BSc, PhD)
- Thesis: Gradual transitions in mixed crystals (1957)

Academic work
- Discipline: Chemistry, Physical Chemistry
- Sub-discipline: Chemical Thermodynamics
- Institutions: UC Berkeley; Physical Chemistry Laboratory; St Catherine's College, Oxford; Cardiff University
- Notable students: John E. Walker
- Main interests: Intermolecular forces, Physiological effects of gases

Professor Sir (Eric) Brian Smith (10 October 1933 – 17 May 2023) was an English physical chemist who was Master of St Catherine's College, Oxford, and vice-chancellor of Cardiff University, Wales.

== Education and career ==
Smith was born in North Wales and attended Wirral Grammar School for Boys. He read Chemistry at University of Liverpool, earning a BSc followed by a PhD. Upon completing his PhD, Smith took up a postdoctoral research fellowship at the University of California at Berkeley, where he worked with Joel Henry Hildebrand. He was next a research fellow at the Physical Chemistry Laboratory at Oxford and was a lecturer and a fellow of St Catherine's College from 1960.

=== Teaching and research ===
During his career, Smith wrote many influential textbooks in the field of Chemical Thermodynamics. His first textbook, Basic Chemical Thermodynamics (1973), continues to be used widely for teaching at Oxford and beyond. During his lectureship at Oxford, Smith taught John E. Walker, who went on to win a Nobel Prize in Chemistry in 1997.

As a researcher, Smith was particularly interested in the physiological effect of gases. Notable practical applications of his work include innovations to general anaesthetics and deep-sea diving.

=== Leadership roles ===
Smith was Master of St Catherine's College (1988–94). In 1993, he was appointed vice-chancellor of Cardiff University, a post he held until his retirement in 2001.

From October 1998, Smith held an administrative role at the Welsh Development Agency, where he assisted in opening up Chinese and Indian commercial markets for Wales. Smith was international ambassador for Cardiff University and served on the Higher Education Funding Council for Wales.

== Recognitions ==
Smith was a recipient of the Potts Medal - a special award for outstanding former students of the Department of Chemistry at University of Liverpool. Smith also received a DSc from the University of Oxford in recognition of this research, notably his contribution to advances in the technology of deep-sea diving.

Smith was made a Knight Bachelor for "services to Academic-Business Partnership and to Higher Education" in the 1999 New Year Honours.

== Personal life ==
Growing up in North Wales and the Wirral, Smith was an ardent supporter of Liverpool Football Club.

In 1957, Smith married Margaret A. Barr (d. 2009), who he had met at University of Liverpool and with whom he shared three children. Smith and Barr separated some time before 1977. In 1983, he remarried to Regina Ball, stylised as Regina, Lady Smith after Smith was awarded his knighthood in 1999. They remained married until Smith's passing on 17 May 2023, aged 89. Smith's funeral took place on 17 June 2023 in Kidlington, Oxfordshire.

Academic offices
Preceded by Sir Patrick Nairne	Master of St Catherine's College, Oxford; 1988–1994	Succeeded by Raymond Plant
Preceded by Sir Aubrey Trotman-Dickenson	Vice-Chancellor of Cardiff University; 1993–2001	Succeeded by David Grant
