= Philip Cowley =

British political scientist and an academic

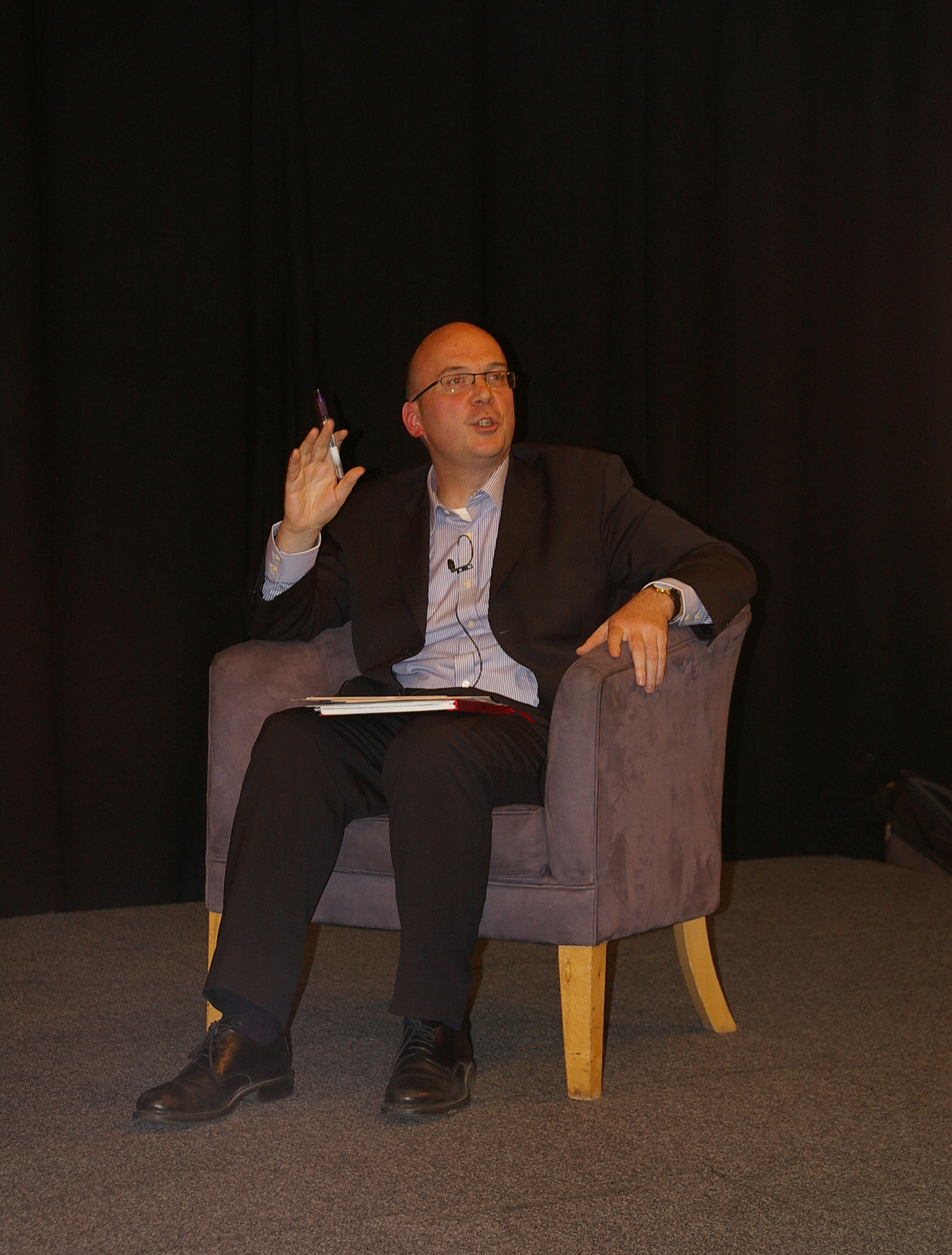
Philip Cowley (pictured) chairs 'The Big Debate' between candidates standing for the Nottingham South constituency at the 2010 General Election.

Philip Cowley is a British political scientist and an academic at Queen Mary University of London in the School of Politics and International Relations. He previously held the same title at the University of Nottingham. Within academia he is particularly notable for his analysis of Parliamentary voting behaviour in the UK House of Commons and House of Lords and secondly his opposition to a lowering of the UK voting age below 18.

== Parliamentary Revolts ==
Cowley is involved in the continuous production of highly detailed and closely analysed briefing papers and reports of divisions in the UK Parliament, with eye-witness accounts of whipping practices in action, counts and comparisons of rebellious voting by Parliamentarians and discussion of how such activity impacts on its political context. He co-ordinates this work through the maintenance of a website produced in a blog format. He is assisted by his colleagues Mark Stuart, also of the University of Nottingham, and Lord Norton of the University of Hull. They are funded by the Economic and Social Research Council and through previous research by their respective universities and the Leverhulme Trust. The project is not affiliated to any political party, nor does it receive funding from any other source.

== "Votes for Adults" ==
He had a website entitled "Votes for Adults" in which he claims to dismiss comprehensively the arguments put forward in support of a reduction of the voting age to 16. This is in opposition to the Votes at 16 campaign, supported by a broad coalition of youth charities and other organisations.

== See also ==
- Nuffield Election Studies

== Bibliography ==
- Developments in British Politics 8, Macmillan, 2006 (ed. Patrick Dunleavy, Richard Heffernan, Philip Cowley & Colin Hay)
- Rebels: How Blair Mislaid His Majority, Politico's 2005 (shortlisted for the Channel 4 Political Awards Book of the Year)
- Revolts and Rebellions: Parliamentary Voting Under Blair, Politico's, 2002 (Winner of W J M Mackenzie Prize for best book published in political science in 2002)
- The British General Election of 2010, Palgrave, 2010
