= Regulatory News Service =

The Regulatory News Service (RNS) is a British filing service that collects and transmits regulatory and non-regulatory information published by public companies to investors. This allows public companies to comply with ongoing disclosure or continues disclosure requirements. Publicly listed companies are required to release all material information to all investors at the same time to avoid disadvantaging some investors and avoid insider trading. This may also be required for transparency legislation. RNS provides a service to public companies to meet this requirement. Investor and financial data vendor can get access to this service to receive these filings.

RNS is designated under United Kingdom rules as Primary Information Provider, which is an organisation that has been recognised by the UK financial regulator as allowing to collect and distributes such information to meet regulatory requirements. RNS is owned by the London Stock Exchange and as of 2017, distributed over 70% of UK company news and results announcements and over 40% of the United States Securities and Exchange Commission (SEC) filings on behalf of FTSE 100 companies, amounting to over 1,000 announcements a day.

== See also ==
- EDGAR
- Insider trading
- Listed company
- Market data
- SEC filing
