= 2024 in Ireland =

- Centuries: 19th; 20th; 21st
- Decades: 2000s; 2010s; 2020s
- See also: 2024 in Northern Ireland; Other events of 2024; List of years in Ireland

Events during the year 2024 in Ireland.

== Incumbents ==
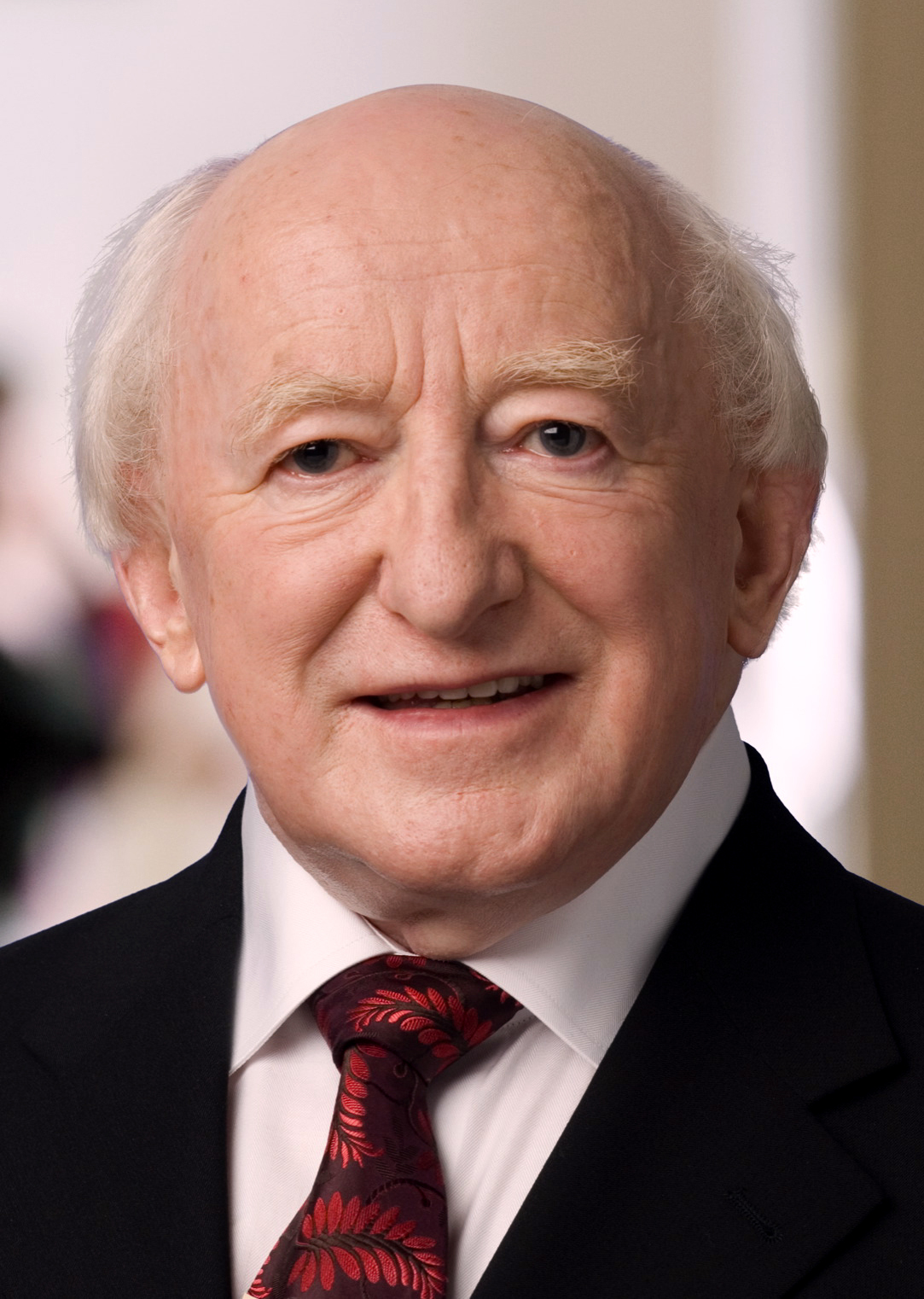
President Michael D. Higgins

- President: Michael D. Higgins
- Taoiseach:
  - Leo Varadkar (FG) (until 9 April 2024)
  - Simon Harris (FG) (from 9 April 2024)
- Tánaiste: Micheál Martin (FF)
- Minister for Finance:
  - Michael McGrath (FF) (until 26 June 2024)
  - Jack Chambers (FF) (from 26 June 2024)
- Chief Justice: Donal O'Donnell
- Dáil:
  - 33rd (until 8 November 2024)
  - 34th (from 18 December 2024)
- Seanad: 26th

== Events ==
=== Continuing events ===
- Irish anti-immigration protests (2022–present)

=== January ===
- 1 January – It was revealed that 184 people were killed on Irish roads in 2023, the highest number of fatalities in almost a decade.
- 4 January – A second man died in hospital following a shooting at a Dublin restaurant on Christmas Eve.
- 5 January – Focus Ireland and the Simon Community described newly released record figures for homelessness (from November 2023) as "shocking", with 9,409 adults and 4,105 children now homeless.
- 9 January
  - 14 migrants were found hidden in a refrigerated trailer at Rosslare Europort in County Wexford.
  - A coroner's inquest held in London found that Sinéad O'Connor died from natural causes.
- 10 January – Gardaí began an investigation into human trafficking after ten Kurdish people from Iran and Iraq, three people from Vietnam, and one from Turkey were discovered in a refrigerated container that arrived at Rosslare Europort.
- 12 January – 17-year-old fifth year student Seán O'Sullivan from Coláiste Chiaráin, County Limerick won the 60th BT Young Scientist and Technology Exhibition with his project 'VerifyMe: A new approach to authors attribution in the post-ChatGPT era'.
- 14 January – Minister of State Jack Chambers came out as gay.
- 17 January – A convent in Lanesborough, County Longford which had been designated as accommodation for Ukrainian refugees was set on fire.
- 18 January – A man died following an explosion at a homeless hostel in Dublin city centre.
- 19 January – The European Court of Human Rights announced that Ireland launched legal action against the United Kingdom on 17 January over the Northern Ireland Troubles (Legacy and Reconciliation) Act 2023 that gives amnesty to British soldiers and members of paramilitary groups in Northern Ireland during the Troubles.
- 22 January
  - Senator David Norris retired from the Seanad after 36 years service. In his final speech, he deplored the slaughter in Gaza: "What is happening to the people of Gaza is appalling and cannot be allowed to continue."
  - The Supreme Court decided unanimously that an unmarried father whose partner died is entitled to a widower's pension. The Minister for Social Protection originally refused him the pension; now, the Government must change social welfare law to comply with the court's decision that the department was guilty of unconstitutional discrimination. There are roughly 170,000 cohabiting couples in the State.
- 24 January – A private members bill brought by the Social Democrats that would have seen Ireland join South Africa's genocide case against Israel at the International Court of Justice was defeated in the Dáil.
- 26 January
  - It was reported that President Michael D. Higgins had been awarded the United Nations Agricola Medal. It was later presented by the Director-General of the Food and Agriculture Organisation (FAO), Qu Dongyu, in a ceremony at Áras an Uachtaráin on 7 June. Higgins was selected by the FAO "in recognition of [his] contribution and commitment to the welfare of all peoples, [his] extraordinary support for FAO's fundamental goal of attaining universal food security, and the pursuit of the United Nations Sustainable Development Goals."
  - Homelessness figures for December were released, showing a slight drop in numbers to 13,318 people, including more than 3,900 children, accessing homelessness services in December. This was the first drop recorded in months, but it is not expected to be sustained.

=== February ===
- 1 February
  - A murder investigation began after a post-mortem examination found that remains which were discovered in east Cork were those of a 47-year-old man who went missing in September 2023.
  - The new Deposit Return Scheme became active. Henceforth, when empty and undamaged plastic, aluminium or steel containers are returned to participating shops and supermarkets, a small deposit, added to the original cost of purchase, is refunded.
- 13 February
  - Prompted by anonymous correspondence, a Garda search of the Santry Demesne began in relation to the disappearance of Jón Jónsson, an Icelandic visitor, five years previously. The search continued for several days.
  - A 37-year-old woman was charged with the murder of her six-year-old son who was found unresponsive in a car in County Waterford.
- 16 February – Gardaí seized 546 kg of crystal methamphetamine worth €32.8 million at Cork Port. The quantity seized was by far the largest ever captured in Ireland. The haul, destined for Australia, was believed to belong to the Mexican Sinaloa Cartel. Two suspects were arrested and firearms were seized.
- 23 February – Record homelessness figures were released by the Department of Housing, showing that in January, 13,531 people were making use of emergency accommodation, including over 4,000 children. The figures did not include more than 1,000 asylum seekers.
- 29 February – President Michael D. Higgins was taken to hospital as a precaution, after complaining of feeling unwell.

=== March ===
- 2 March – A man in his 40s was hospitalised with serious injuries after masked men armed with machetes and slash hooks stormed an Under-14 boxing event in Castlerea, County Roscommon.
- 8 March – Constitutional referendums on family matters took place on International Women's Day. Voters rejected both Government proposals to change the constitution, with 67.7% voting No in the Family referendum, while 73.9% voted No in the Care referendum.
- 20 March – Leo Varadkar announced his resignation as Taoiseach and Leader of Fine Gael, citing political and personal reasons.
- 22 March
  - Josepha Madigan announced her resignation as Minister of State for Special Education and Inclusion and that she would not contest the next general election.
  - Four men were arrested and a firearm seized following a Garda operation in Dublin, during which a man who was reported kidnapped in Belfast was found safe and well.
  - Two men in their 50s were arrested in connection with the Garda investigation into the tragedy in which ten people died in Creeslough, County Donegal.
- 24 March – Simon Harris was confirmed as the new leader of Fine Gael, paving the way for the 37-year-old to become Ireland's youngest Taoiseach.
- 26 March – Investigations were launched into a fire at a house in Swinford, County Mayo which claimed the lives of an elderly couple.

=== April ===
- 2 April – Simon Coveney announced he would step down as Minister for Enterprise, Trade and Employment when Dáil Éireann reconvenes after Easter.
- 3 April – A man in his 30s died in hospital following a serious assault in Clondalkin, Dublin over the Easter weekend.
- 8 April – Leo Varadkar tendered his resignation as Taoiseach to President Michael D. Higgins at Áras an Uachtaráin.
- 9 April – Fine Gael leader Simon Harris, aged 37, became Ireland's youngest Taoiseach after a Dáil vote of 88–69 and being appointed by the President.
- 10 April – A large fire destroyed industrial units in Dublin known as the 'home of car culture in Ireland'. The buildings were home to Deane Motors, Drift Games and JC Autocare.
- 18 April – An inquest into the Stardust fire returned a verdict of unlawful killing.
- 23 April
  - In a statement to the Dáil, Taoiseach Simon Harris delivered a formal state apology to the victims of the Stardust fire and their families.
  - The tánaiste and minister for foreign affairs Micheál Martin accused Israel of vindictive punishment of the civilian population of Gaza during a visit to the Rafah Border Crossing in Palestine. He condemned Israeli petty confiscations of emergency humanitarian aid from war victims and described Israel's bombing campaign in Gaza as "barbarity". During a meeting with Egyptian foreign minister Sameh Shoukry he discussed Irish and European plans to recognise the State of Palestine.
- 28 April – Taoiseach Simon Harris said that other countries' migration policies "cannot be allowed to undermine" that of Ireland after it emerged that 80% of recent migrant arrivals in Ireland were people who crossed from the UK.
- 30 April – Cabinet approved legislation drawn up by Minister for Justice Helen McEntee that would re-designate the UK as a "safe country" to which asylum seekers can be returned.

=== May ===
- 2 May – The Irish Times Group announced that it had acquired the death notice website, RIP.ie. The website was launched in 2005 and received 60 million page views per month when sold.
- 6 May – Gardaí launched an investigation after a man was shot dead in the Drimnagh area of Dublin shortly after midnight.
- 7 May – A 26-year-old man was sentenced to life imprisonment for the murder of his two sisters and brother in Tallaght, Dublin in September 2022.
- 13 May – The New York–Dublin Portal connecting the two cities via video screens was temporarily turned off, following reports that participants were behaving inappropriately.
- 19 May – Dublin City Council announced that the New York–Dublin Portal would reopen, but with hours limited between 11 am and 9 pm instead of 24 hours.
- 22 May – The three leaders of the Coalition Government – Taoiseach Simon Harris, Tánaiste Micheál Martin, and Minister Eamon Ryan – announced that Ireland, Norway, and Spain would recognise the State of Palestine on 28 May. In response, the Israeli foreign ministry said it would reprimand the three countries' ambassadors to Israel and show them video of female hostages being held by Hamas. Israel also recalled its own ambassadors to the three countries, having argued that such recognition would encourage Hamas terrorism.
- 28 May – The government officially recognised the State of Palestine. The Palestinian flag was raised outside Leinster House, the seat of government.
- 31 May
  - Former Circuit Court judge Gerard O'Brien was sent to prison for four years for sexually assaulting six boys and for the attempted rape of one of them.
  - Gardaí in Dublin began wearing body cameras for the first time. It was planned to extend the practice to the whole country eventually.
- May – Construction began on the cross-border Narrow Water Bridge, which will span the narrowest point of Carlingford Lough, connecting Omeath, County Louth, with Narrow Water near Warrenpoint, County Down.

=== June ===
- 7 June – A series of elections was held: the European Parliament election, local elections, and a Limerick mayoral election.
- 13 June – A former scout leader, Noel Sheehan of Glenville, County Cork, was sentenced to 4½ years in prison, with the final six months suspended, for the sexual assault and psychological damage of young scouts during the late 1980s.
- 18 June – Eamon Ryan announced his resignation as leader of the Green Party and said he would not stand in the next general election. Catherine Martin resigned as deputy party leader.
- 19 June – The date of the Green Party leadership election was set for 8 July.
- 20 June
  - A 22-year-old soldier who beat a woman unconscious in a random street attack, and boasted about it on social media, walked free from court after Judge Tom O'Donnell gave him a fully suspended sentence which the victim described as "not justice".
  - Aer Lingus confirmed it would cancel between 10 and 20 percent of its flights over the first five days of planned industrial action by pilots, affecting up to 40,000 passengers.
- 21 June
  - The Defence Forces began internal proceedings in relation to the case of a soldier who beat a woman unconscious in an attack, which Tánaiste and Minister for Defence Micheál Martin "condemns unequivocally".
  - The Irish Airline Pilots Association announced an official eight-hour strike on 29 June, in addition to its indefinite work-to-rule.
- 22 June – Thousands of people marched in cities around Ireland to protest against the suspended court sentence given to the soldier Cathal Crotty who beat Natasha O’Brien unconscious during a random street attack in Limerick in 2022. The taoiseach, Simon Harris, condemned the attack as part of "an epidemic of gender-based violence".
- 24 June – Minister for Finance Michael McGrath was named by the government as Ireland's nomination for European Commissioner.
- 25 June – Jack Chambers was named as the new Finance Minister to succeed Michael McGrath.
- 27 June
  - Taoiseach Simon Harris described a bomb threat made on his family home as "utterly unacceptable".
  - A report into serving members of the Defence Forces found 68 personnel had criminal convictions or were currently before the courts on criminal charges which ranged from drink-driving to rape.
- 29 June – Hundreds of striking Aer Lingus pilots marched at Dublin Airport as part of a dispute with the airline over pay.

=== July ===
- 2 July – Catherine Murphy and Róisín Shortall of the Social Democrats announced that they would not contest the next general election. Party leader Holly Cairns described them as "trailblazers in Irish politics".
- 8 July – Minister for Children Roderic O'Gorman won the Green Party leadership election to succeed Eamon Ryan and became leader of the party.
- 10 July – Authorities in Dubai confirmed that charges of attempted suicide and alcohol consumption against 28-year-old Irish woman Tori Towey were dropped and a travel ban imposed had been lifted, after her case was raised in the Dáil. Taoiseach Simon Harris said this was a situation that "should never have happened".
- 12 July – Minister for Rural and Community Development Heather Humphreys described plans to ban the XL bully crossbreed dog, which would include fines of up to €2,500, a prison term, or both for those in breach of the ban.
- 13 July – Taoiseach Simon Harris met Ukrainian president Volodymyr Zelenskyy at Shannon Airport as the latter briefly visited Ireland on his way back to Kyiv from the 2024 Washington summit, and announced he would visit Kyiv later in the year.
- 14 July – Róisín Garvey was elected as deputy leader of the Green Party.
- 15 July
  - Twenty-one people were arrested and charged after public disorder took place at a former factory in Coolock, Dublin intended to house asylum seekers, in which three garda cars were damaged, petrol bombs thrown, and fires lit on the roads.
  - Following reports that Fine Gael Teachta Dála (TD) and Minister of State Colm Burke was refused Holy Communion at a funeral mass because of his stance on abortion, the Association of Catholic Priests said it "unambiguously condemned" the incident.
- 17 July – A death threat was made against Sinn Féin leader Mary Lou McDonald in a video posted on TikTok by a man who said he would shoot and kill her.
- 19 July
  - Ryanair flights and National Car Test centres were disrupted due to a global computer outage.
  - Three gardaí were injured, including one hospitalised, and one arrest was made after anti-immigration disturbances broke out in Coolock for a second time.
- 27 July – Gardaí and Department of Agriculture personnel investigated a suspected cockfighting event at a home in Emyvale, County Monaghan. A crowd of people ran away as the gardaí arrived. Fifteen dead cocks and seventy live ones were seized.

=== August ===
- 1 August – The High Court ruled that Ireland has breached the Charter of Fundamental Rights of the European Union in its response to the needs of International Protection applicants (asylum seekers). Mr Justice Barry O'Donnell accepted that the State "is making strenuous efforts to redress the situation" therefore he did not agree to compel the State to fulfill its obligations. The ruling was welcomed by the Irish Human Rights and Equality Commission, the Movement of Asylum Seekers in Ireland, and the Irish Refugee Council.
- 2 August – A 40-year-old man from Bray was arrested in Dublin after ramming his van into the gates of Áras an Uachtaráin, the Custom House, Leinster House, Government Buildings and the Attorney General's Office in the early hours of the morning. All incidents were recorded by surveillance cameras and damage worth tens of thousands of euros was caused.
- 15 August – An Irish Army chaplain in his 50s was seriously injured while being stabbed a number of times outside Renmore Barracks in County Galway. A terror motive was investigated and a 16-year-old boy was arrested.
- 17 August – A teenage boy was charged in connection with the stabbing of an Army chaplain at Renmore Barracks.
- 21 August – A man was arrested in Dublin over a 1982 bomb attack in County Armagh during the Troubles that killed three officers of the Royal Ulster Constabulary. He was remanded in custody the following day pending an extradition hearing.
- 26 August – The Independent Commission for the Location of Victims' Remains began searching farmland in County Louth for the remains of Captain Robert Nairac, a British soldier shot by the Provisional IRA while working undercover in Northern Ireland in 1977.
- 30 August – Figures for homeless people living in emergency accommodation reached another record high, with 10,028 adults and 4,401 children living in emergency accommodation in July – the seventh consecutive month which broke homelessness records.

=== September ===
- 1 September – A newly-built bike shed at Leinster House, Dublin which stores 18/36 bicycles was revealed to have cost €336,051.
- 3 September – A Government-appointed inquiry revealed that 2,395 allegations of sexual abuse had been made in 308 primary and secondary schools run by religious orders across Ireland, spanning a 30-year period. Minister for Education Norma Foley said the level of abuse was "truly shocking" and a commission of investigation would be established.
- 10 September
  - The Court of Justice of the European Union ruled that Apple Inc. must pay €13 billion to the government of Ireland as compensation for extraordinarily low taxes levied by Ireland against Apple.
  - The Cabinet gave its approval for draft laws banning the sale of disposable vapes in Ireland.
- 17 September – The National Parks and Wildlife Service reported that a record 78,175 wild deer were killed by hunters during the year ending on 28 February 2023, mostly in counties Wicklow, Cork, Waterford, Tipperary, Kerry, Galway and Clare. Deer are legally protected but lack natural predators in Ireland therefore hunting is allowed to control overpopulation in order to limit habitat damage by the animals.
- 19 September – Nineteen people were arrested at an anti-immigration rally that saw multiple public order incidents across central Dublin.
- 21 September
  - Minister for Justice Helen McEntee confirmed she had dropped plans to introduce specific hate speech legislation, but would instead include the hate speech element in new draft legislation.
  - A monument was unveiled by members of the Spanish Navy at Streedagh Beach near Grange, County Sligo during the annual commemoration of the deaths of more than 1,100 Spaniards on 21 September 1588, when three ships of the Spanish Armada sank there.
- 28 September – Sinn Féin president Mary Lou McDonald told her party's annual conference that the next Irish government will include a Minister for Reunification if Sinn Féin are part of the administration.
- 29 September – Phase 6a of the BusConnects transport infrastructure programme is launched in Dublin, and concluded in January 2025

=== October ===
- 1 October – The Minister for Finance, Jack Chambers, and the Minister for Public Expenditure, Paschal Donohoe, unveiled Budget 2025, with energy credits, bonus social welfare payments, a higher minimum wage and tax changes announced.
- 2 October – The president of Vietnam, Tô Lâm, began a two-day visit to Ireland by meeting President Higgins and his wife, Sabina, at Áras an Uachtaráin. The two leaders held talks during this first state visit to Ireland by a Vietnamese president, which reciprocated Higgins' inaugural visit by an Irish president to Vietnam in 2016. Lâm returned to the Áras for a state dinner in the evening along with members of the Irish Vietnamese community.
- 3 October – A teenager who killed a 51-year-old woman in County Offaly in September 2023 and posted a video of the murder on Snapchat was given a sentence of life in detention with a review after 15 years.
- 6 October – A newspaper story was published that an unnamed Oireachtas politician had been recruited as a spy by Russia, using a honeytrap approach (seduction). The alleged event occurred during the Brexit talks, when Russia sought to undermine relations between Ireland, Britain, and the European Union. The taoiseach remarked that it should not surprise anyone.
- 15 October – Niall Ó Donnghaile revealed that he was the Sinn Féin member who was suspended for sending inappropriate messages to a teenage boy and an adult in September 2023. Party leader Mary Lou McDonald told the Dáil that Ó Donnghaile resigned, following allegations of the sending of inappropriate messages to a 17-year-old male.
- 18 October – An Uisce Éireann document seen by the broadcaster RTÉ's Prime Time team said that more than 40 years will be needed to correct wastewater treatment problems and public water infrastructure deficiencies in Ireland. This estimated lengthy delay conflicts dramatically with an analysis published by the Environmental Protection Agency which projects necessary corrections being achieved in half the time; it conflicts with a government goal to restore water quality by 2027; and it further delays the long-overdue fulfillment of Irish obligations under the European Union's Water Framework Directive.
- 19 October
  - Heather Humphreys, the deputy leader of Fine Gael, announced she would not contest the next general election.
  - Taoiseach Simon Harris appointed Minister for Justice Helen McEntee to replace Heather Humphreys as deputy leader of Fine Gael.
- 20 October – The teenager who received inappropriate messages from Niall Ó Donnghaile revealed he was 16-years-old at the time, contradicting a claim by Mary Lou McDonald that he was 17 and called for her apology for the party's "disastrous handling" of his case, saying her tribute to Ó Donnghaile when he resigned was "like a mental stab".
- 22 October – Convicted murderer Thomas McCabe, arrested by gardaí in August 2024 after being on the run for a year, was returned to prison in Northern Ireland.
- 31 October – An internet rumour that a Hallowe'en parade would take place on O'Connell Street in Dublin attracted hundreds of people into the city. The hoax led to brief public transport disruption and gardaí asked the crowd to disperse.

=== November ===
- 1 November – Health Minister Stephen Donnelly announced that the Irish Government would fund 150 places for students to study health at Ulster University at a cost of €9.5m (£8m).
- 5 November – A civil sexual assault case taken by Nikita Ní Laimhín against fighter Conor McGregor began in the High Court. The rape was alleged to have taken place in December 2018.
- 8 November – President Higgins dissolved the 33rd Dáil at the request of Taoiseach Harris. A three-week election campaign began for a general election on 29 November.
- 9 November – Ryanair CEO Michael O'Leary criticised teachers at a Fine Gael party gathering saying, "The Dáil is full of teachers ... but I wouldn't generally employ a lot of teachers to go out and get things done." His remarks were angrily condemned later by the leaders of the main political parties and by teacher unions.
- 12 November – The postal service An Post ended the use of savings stamps, which had largely been used by young savers.
- 22 November
  - The taoiseach said that the prime minister of Israel, Benjamin Netanyahu, would be arrested if he set foot in Ireland. This followed the issuance of an arrest warrant for Netanyahu by the International Criminal Court the previous day for alleged war crimes and crimes against humanity in Gaza.
  - The fighter Conor McGregor was found guilty of rape in the High Court. The jury awarded the plaintiff €250,000 in damages. It emerged after the verdict was announced that the plaintiff's partner had been stabbed when attackers wearing balaclavas invaded her home in June.
- 23 November
  - Several thousand homes in Donegal were left without power after Storm Bert brought heavy rain and high winds to Ireland.
  - Justice Minister Helen McEntee commended the plaintiff in the Conor McGregor case for her "bravery and determination".
- 29 November – The 2024 general election was held. Voter turnout was 59.7%, the lowest since the foundation of the state. Fianna Fáil emerged as the largest party with 48 Dáil seats, followed by Sinn Féin with 39 and Fine Gael with 38.

=== December ===
- 1 December – An eight-year-old girl was murdered in New Ross, County Wexford.
- 4 December – A Eurobarometer survey reported that, despite official Irish military neutrality, almost two-thirds of Irish people agreed with funding military aid to Ukraine.
- 5 December – Irish dry stone wall construction (using stones only, with no mortar) was added to the UNESCO list of intangible cultural heritages. This was the fifth Irish practice recognised by the UN following hurling, uilleann piping, Irish harping, and Irish falconry.
- 7 December – More than 400,000 homes and businesses were without power after Storm Darragh brought strong northwest winds to the country with gusts of up to 141 km/h. Met Éireann had issued a Status Red warning for seven counties, with a Status Orange warning for the rest of the country. The Electricity Supply Board said the storm's effect was greater than that of Storm Ophelia in 2017.
- 8 December – Syrian refugees gathered in Ballaghaderreen and Clonskeagh to celebrate the sudden fall of the Assad regime in their home country. News from Damascus was slightly delayed in Ballaghaderreen by interruption of the electricity supply caused by Storm Darragh.
- 9 December – Fianna Fáil leader Micheál Martin and Fine Gael leader Simon Harris held talks aimed at forming the next government; both parties later released a joint statement confirming negotiations would begin the following day.
- 11 December – The president of Egypt, Abdel Fattah el-Sisi, paid a courtesy call to President Higgins and had lunch with Taoiseach Harris. He talked with both men about Palestine and Syria, and about ties between Egypt and Ireland. It was the first Irish trip by an Egyptian president since Hosni Mubarak visited in 2006.
- 15 December
  - Israel announced that it will close its embassy in Ireland because of what was described as "the extreme anti-Israel policies of the Irish government". The taoiseach said the decision was "deeply regrettable" while the tánaiste said Ireland did not intend to respond in kind.
  - The postal service An Post announced it was abandoning its plan to use Holyhead Port in Wales for Christmas deliveries as the port will remain closed until 18 December as a result of damage caused by Storm Darragh.
- 17 December – The ambassador of Italy, Nicola Faganello, and the ambassador of Palestine, Jilan Wahba Abdalmajid, were officially accredited as ambassadors to Ireland when President Higgins accepted their credentials in the State Reception Room at Áras an Uachtaráin. Afterwards, military honours were rendered, outside. The ambassadors were accompanied to and from the ceremony by a motorcycle escort of honour, drawn from the Cavalry Squadron.
- 18 December
  - Post-election sitting of the new Dáil: Taoiseach Simon Harris visited Áras an Uachtaráin to tender his resignation to President Higgins; he will continue to serve until a successor is appointed. The 34th Dáil met for the first time, and Verona Murphy was elected by the deputies as the first female Ceann Comhairle in Dáil Eireann. The Sinn Féin party nominated Mary Lou McDonald as taoiseach, but the motion was defeated. The Dáil adjourned after voting to return on 22 January; many opposition TDs preferred 15 January, but they were outvoted.
  - The Department of Defence ordered a new government jet, a French Falcon 6X, currently under construction, to replace the existing troublesome 30-year-old Learjet. Delivery is expected by December 2025 at a cost of €53 million plus tax.
- 22 December – The Health Service Executive reported that at least 2,700 cyclists were treated for injuries as hospital in-patients in the past two years. The figures included only publicly funded acute hospitals and did not include patients treated in emergency departments or as out-patients, so did not account for all cycling injuries.
- 27 December – The National Parks and Wildlife Service announced that Mayo International Dark Sky Park in the Wild Nephin National Park had been awarded the Dark Sky Place of the Year Award 2024 by the DarkSky International organisation.
- 29 December – The Department of Defence contracted to buy four Airbus H145M light-utility helicopters, at a cost of €91.7 million plus tax, for delivery in early 2027 to replace ageing EC-135 Irish Air Corps helicopters. The new aircraft were assigned to pilot training programmes, intelligence, surveillance, reconnaissance, light combat, and police support operations.
- 30 December
  - Ballot papers were issued to the electorate in the 2025 Seanad election for university members; this election phase was due to conclude next 29 January.
  - Conor Murphy, a minister in the Northern Ireland Executive, announced he would contest the Seanad election for Sinn Féin, saying he will resign as a member of the Northern Ireland Assembly if successful.
- 31 December – Hate crime legislation came into effect when the minister for justice Helen McEntee signed the commencement order for the Criminal Justice (Hate Offences) Act 2024. Ireland was one of the last countries in the European Union to enact such law. The Act joined the Prohibition of Incitement to Hatred Act 1989 which penalised hate speech.

== Arts ==
- 7 January – Irish actor Cillian Murphy won the best actor award at the Golden Globes ceremony in Beverly Hills, California for his leading performance in the film Oppenheimer.
- 26 January – Bambie Thug was chosen to represent Ireland in the Eurovision Song Contest 2024 with the song Doomsday Blue. The winner was chosen by combined votes of the public vote, an international jury and a national jury on the Late Late Show Eurosong Special.
- 11 February – Sinéad O'Connor was posthumously nominated for the Rock & Roll Hall of Fame.
- 10 March – Cillian Murphy became the first Irish-born actor to win the best actor award at the Oscar ceremony in Hollywood, California for his leading performance in the film Oppenheimer.
- 17 March – All-female Irish traditional music band BIIRD played their inaugural concert, in Trafalgar Square, London.
- 11 May – Bambie Thug came sixth place in the Eurovision Song Contest, marking the country's first top-ten finish since 2011.
- 28 July – President Higgins led tributes to writer Edna O'Brien who died the previous day in London, aged 93, describing her as "a fearless teller of truths" and "a superb writer possessed of the moral courage to confront Irish society with realities long ignored and suppressed." Taoiseach Simon Harris described O'Brien as "a brave, gifted, dignified and magnetic person".

== Sport ==
=== Association football (men) ===
- 10 July – Heimir Hallgrímsson was appointed the new Irish men's football manager following an eight-month recruitment process.
- 7 November – A football supporter won a court case against the Football Association of Ireland in Dublin District Court because the FAI failed to update its website to advise the public of a change of date for an international away match in Armenia in 2022. The plaintiff was awarded damages to compensate him for extra travelling costs he incurred because of the wrong match date information.

==== Men's senior international friendly matches ====
- 23 March – Ireland 0–0 Belgium.
- 26 March – Ireland 0–1 Switzerland.
- 4 June – Ireland 2–1 Hungary.
- 11 June – Portugal 3–0 Ireland.

==== Nations League ====
- 7 September – Ireland 0–2 England.
- 10 September – Ireland 0–2 Greece.
- 10 October – Finland 1–2 Ireland.
- 13 October – Greece 2–0 Ireland.
- 14 November – Ireland 1–0 Finland.
- 17 November – England 5–0 Ireland.
- 22 November – Two Nations League play-off fixtures were announced:

20 March 2025 – Bulgaria v Ireland.
23 March 2025 – Ireland v Bulgaria.

==== 2026 World Cup qualification ====
- 13 December – A draw took place in Zurich, placing the senior international men's team in Group F of the 2026 World Cup qualification competition. The group will contain Armenia, Hungary, Ireland, and either Denmark or Portugal, depending on the outcome of two Nations League quarter-final playoff matches between those two nations in March 2025.

==== Men's Under-17 European Championship qualification ====
- 20 March – Portugal 4–1 Ireland.
- 23 March – Germany 2–0 Ireland.
- 26 March – Ireland 0–5 Croatia.

==== Men's Under-21 friendly matches ====
- 22 March – San Marino 0–7 Ireland.

==== UEFA Europa League final ====
- 22 May – Atalanta 3–0 Bayer Leverkusen (match played in Dublin).

=== Association football (women) ===
==== Senior international friendly matches ====
- 23 February – Italy 0–0 Ireland.
- 27 February – Ireland 0–2 Wales.

==== Women's Euro 2025 qualifiers ====
- 5 April – France 1–0 Ireland.
- 9 April – Ireland 0–2 England.
- 31 May – Ireland 0–3 Sweden.
- 4 June – Sweden 1–0 Ireland.
- 12 July – England 2–1 Ireland.
- 16 July – Ireland 3–1 France.

Play-off semi-finals

- 25 October – Georgia 0–6 Ireland.
- 29 October – Ireland 3–0 Georgia.

Play-off finals

- 29 November – Wales 1–1 Ireland.
- 3 December – Ireland 1–2 Wales.

=== Gaelic Athletic Association ===
- 29 March – Down goalkeeper Charlie Smyth signed a three-year contract with the New Orleans Saints, becoming the first Gaelic Athletic Association (GAA) player to sign an American National Football League contract as part of the International Player Pathway Program.
- 4 April – The GAA defended its decision to report the Supermac's fast-food company to the Meta technology company over April Fools' Day Facebook and Instagram posts by Supermac's which featured an altered image of the GAA's Croke Park stadium, saying "the use of any registered trademark is not permitted, in jest or otherwise", resulting in the Supermac's Instagram and Facebook accounts being suspended.

=== Olympic sports ===
==== Summer Olympics ====
For results, see: Ireland at the 2024 Summer Olympics.

- 24 July – Ireland began its participation in the Summer Olympics with victories in Paris against South Africa and Japan in the rugby sevens event. This year marked the centenary of Ireland's first Olympics as an independent nation, in Paris in 1924.
- 12 August – Ireland's Olympic athletes were welcomed home from the games in Paris by a crowd at Dublin Airport. Another gathering of 20,000 people in O'Connell Street, Dublin attended the first civic reception ever held for returning Olympic athletes. Officials greeting the team included the taoiseach Simon Harris, the lord mayor of Dublin James Geoghegan, the minister for sport Catherine Martin, and the minister of state for sport and physical education Thomas Byrne. Team Ireland's 133 athletes competed in 14 sports and won seven medals, coming 19th on the medals table, Ireland's greatest success at the Olympic games.

==== Summer Paralympics ====
For results, see: Ireland at the 2024 Summer Paralympics.

- 28 August – Irish paralympians took part in the opening ceremony parade for the Paris 2024 Paralympic Games on the Champs-Élysées and Place de la Concorde in Paris.

=== Rugby ===
==== Six Nations Championship ====
- 2 February – France 17–38 Ireland.
- 11 February – Ireland 36–0 Italy.
- 24 February – Ireland 31–7 Wales.
- 9 March – England 23–22 Ireland.
- 16 March – Ireland 17–13 Scotland. Ireland won the Six Nations Championship for the second year in a row after defeating Scotland in their final rugby match of the contest.

==== Summer Internationals ====
- 6 July – South Africa 27–20 Ireland.
- 13 July - South Africa 24–25 Ireland.

==== Autumn Nations Series ====
- 8 November – Ireland 13–23 New Zealand.
- 15 November – Ireland 22–19 Argentina.
- 23 November – Ireland 52–17 Fiji.
- 30 November – Ireland 22–19 Australia, on the 150th anniversary of the Irish Rugby Union.

=== Running ===
- 7 June – The Irish mixed 4 × 400 m relay team of Chris O'Donnell, Rhasidat Adeleke, Thomas Barr, and Sharlene Mawdsley won a gold medal at the European Athletics Championships in Rome.

=== Swimming ===
- 14 February – Daniel Wiffen became the 800m freestyle swimming world champion when he won a gold medal at the World Aquatics Championships in Doha.
- 15 June – Five women swam a relay of the North Channel between Ireland and Scotland, starting in 11.8 °C water from Donaghadee and reaching Portpatrick. Afric Creedon, Jackie O'Connor, Karen Molloy, Orla Colreavy, and Siobhán O'Driscoll took half a day to swim a curved 42.2 kilometre route whose course was shaped by the tide.

== Deaths ==
=== January ===
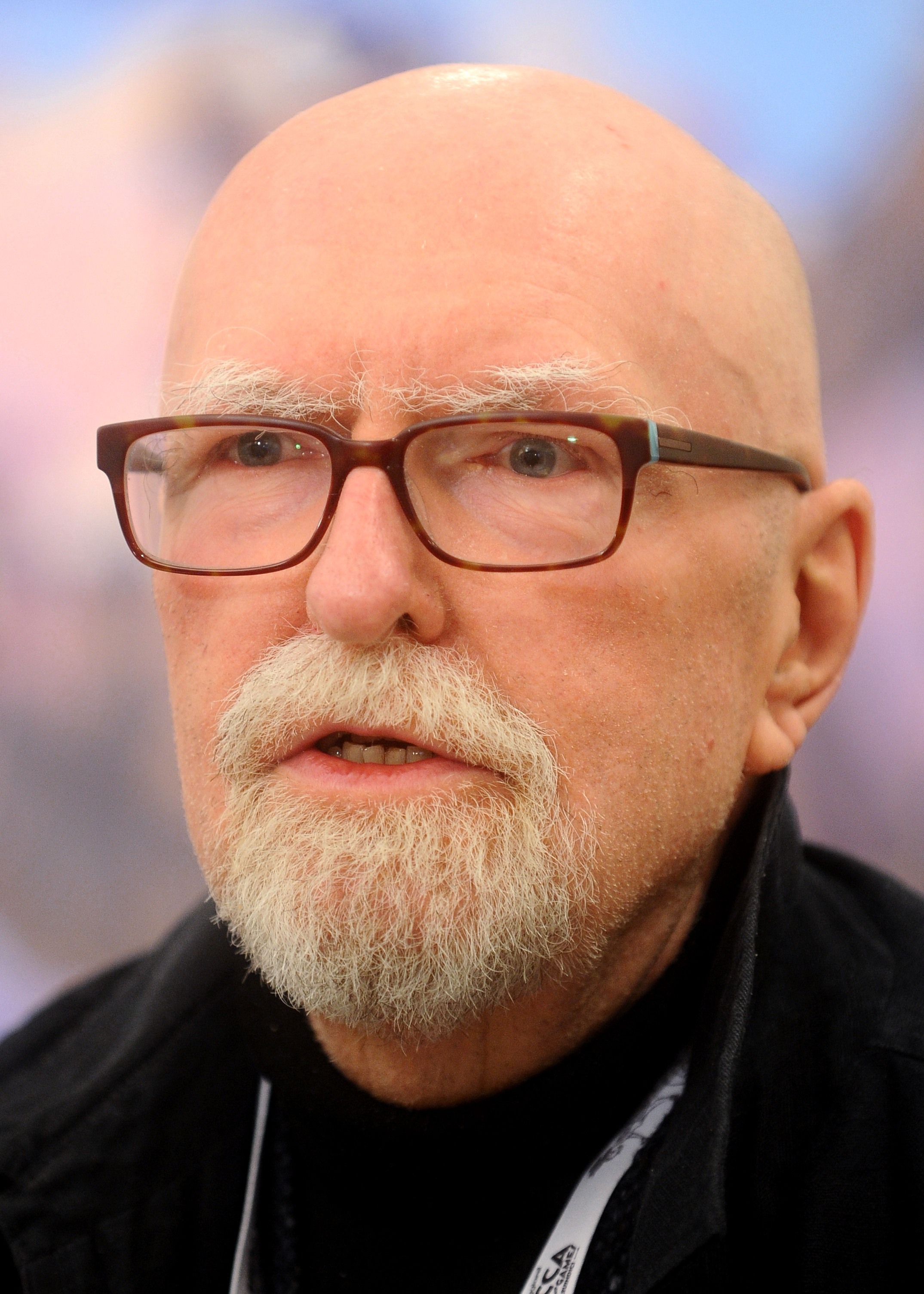
James Herbert Brennan

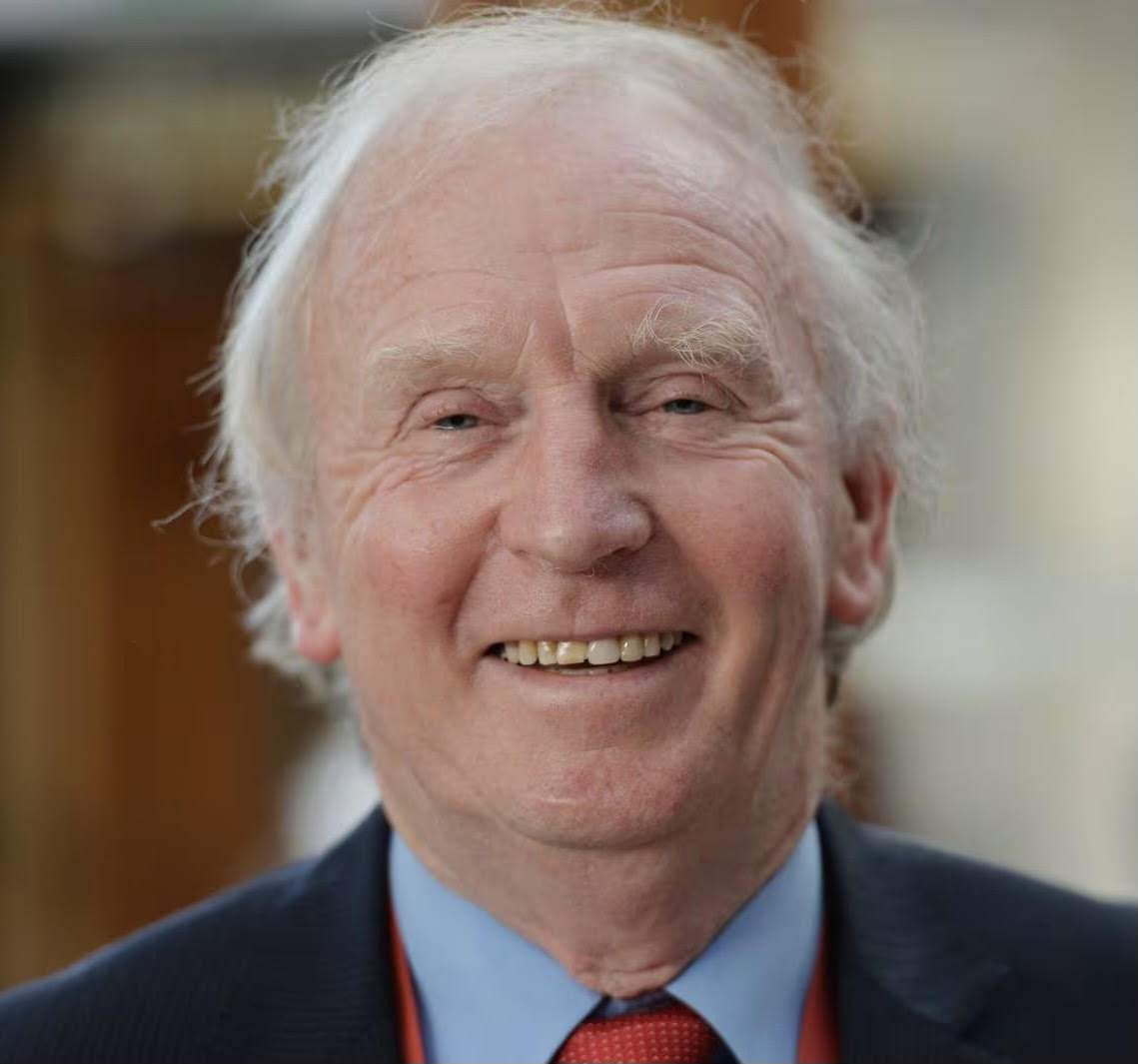
Jimmy Somers

- 1 January
  - John Kinsella, 76, hurler (Bennettsbridge, Kilkenny senior team).
  - James Herbert Brennan, 83, lecturer and author. Born in Northern Ireland.
- 2 January – Seán Donnelly, 83, Gaelic footballer and manager (Longford Slashers, Longford senior team).
- 5 January
  - William Lee, 82, Roman Catholic prelate, Bishop of Waterford and Lismore (1993–2013).
  - Con O'Leary, 77, politician, councillor (1991–2004).
- 12 January – Jimmy Somers, 84, trade unionist.
- 13 January – Christopher Moriarty, 87, naturalist, icthyologist and author.
- 18 January – Seán Dineen, 79, mathematician.
- 20 January – Donal O'Grady, 96, hurler (Tubber, Faughs, Clare senior team, Munster).
- 21 January
  - Ian Bailey, 66, journalist and former suspect in the murder of Sophie Toscan du Plantier.
  - Thomas Hussey, 87, politician, TD (1969–1981), Minister of State (1978–1981) and senator (1981–1992).
- 22 January – Jackie O'Gorman, 80, hurler (Cratloe, Clare senior team, Munster).
- 24 January
  - Ivor Browne, 94, psychiatrist.
  - Mattie McAuliffe, 94, hurler (Castlemagner, Cork senior team).
- 25 January – Ger Connolly, 86, politician, TD (1969–1997), Minister of State (1979–1981, 1982 and 1987–1992).
- 27 January – John Connor, 79, politician, TD (1981–1982 and 1989–1997) and senator (1983–1989 and 1997–2002).

=== February ===
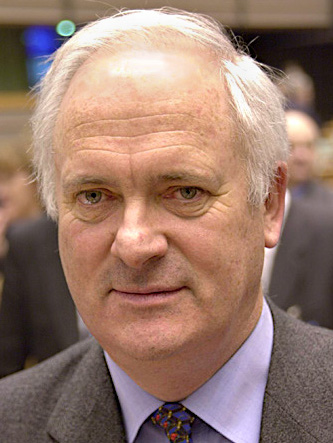
John Bruton

- 5 February – John Bruton, 76, politician, TD (1969–2004), leader of Fine Gael (1990–2001) and Taoiseach (1994–1997).
- 10 February – Shane O'Hanlon, Gaelic football selector (St Vincent's, Dublin senior team).
- 13 February – Séamus Flynn, 84, Gaelic footballer (Clonguish, Longford senior team, Leinster).
- 16 February – Pa Finn, 87, hurler (St Finbarr's) and manager (Kilbrittain, Cork senior camogie team).
- 18 February – Michael O'Regan, 70, journalist (The Irish Times).
- 22 February – Robert Ellison, 82, Roman Catholic prelate, bishop of Banjul (2006–2017).
- 24 February – Anne Ebbs, 82, table tennis player, Paralympic silver medallist (1972, 1984).

=== March ===
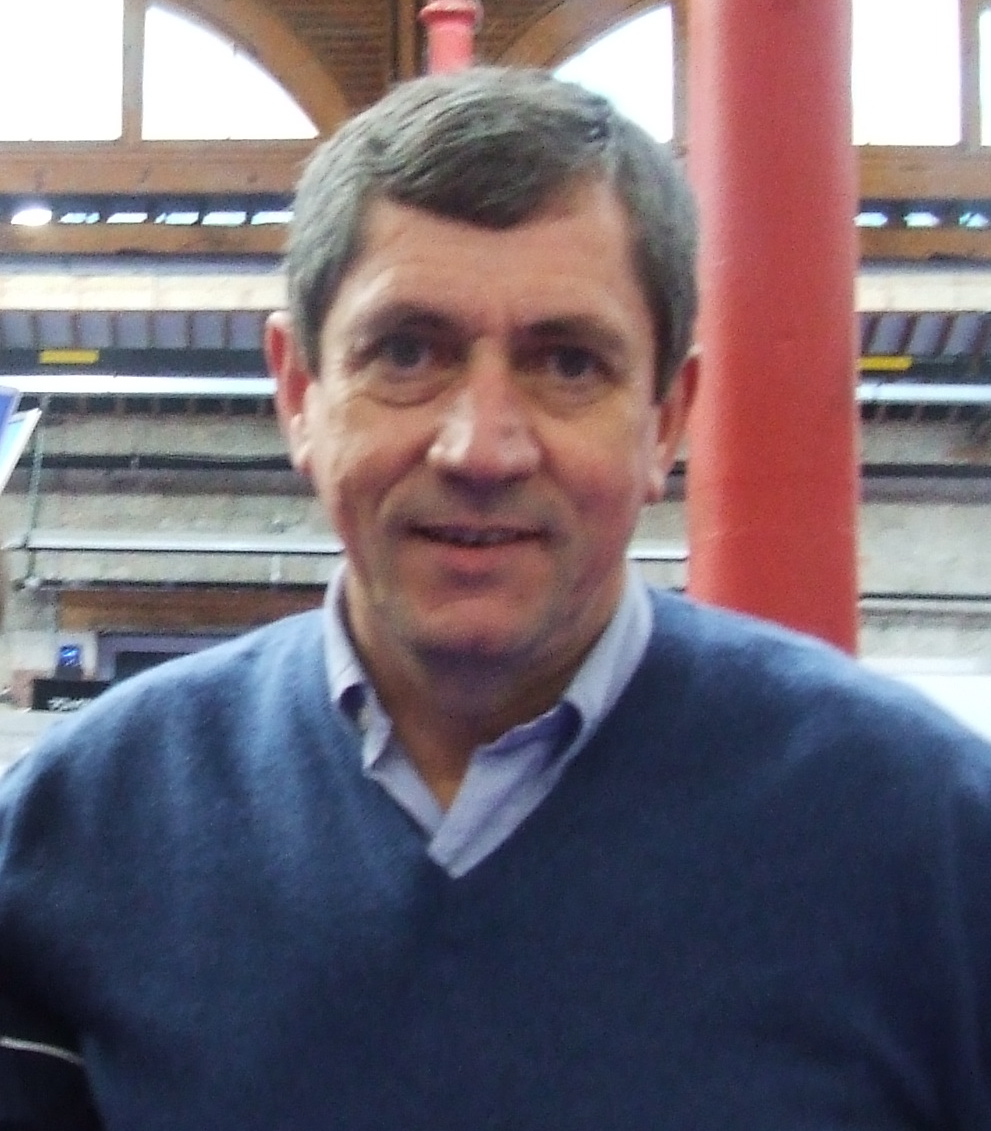
Charlie Bird

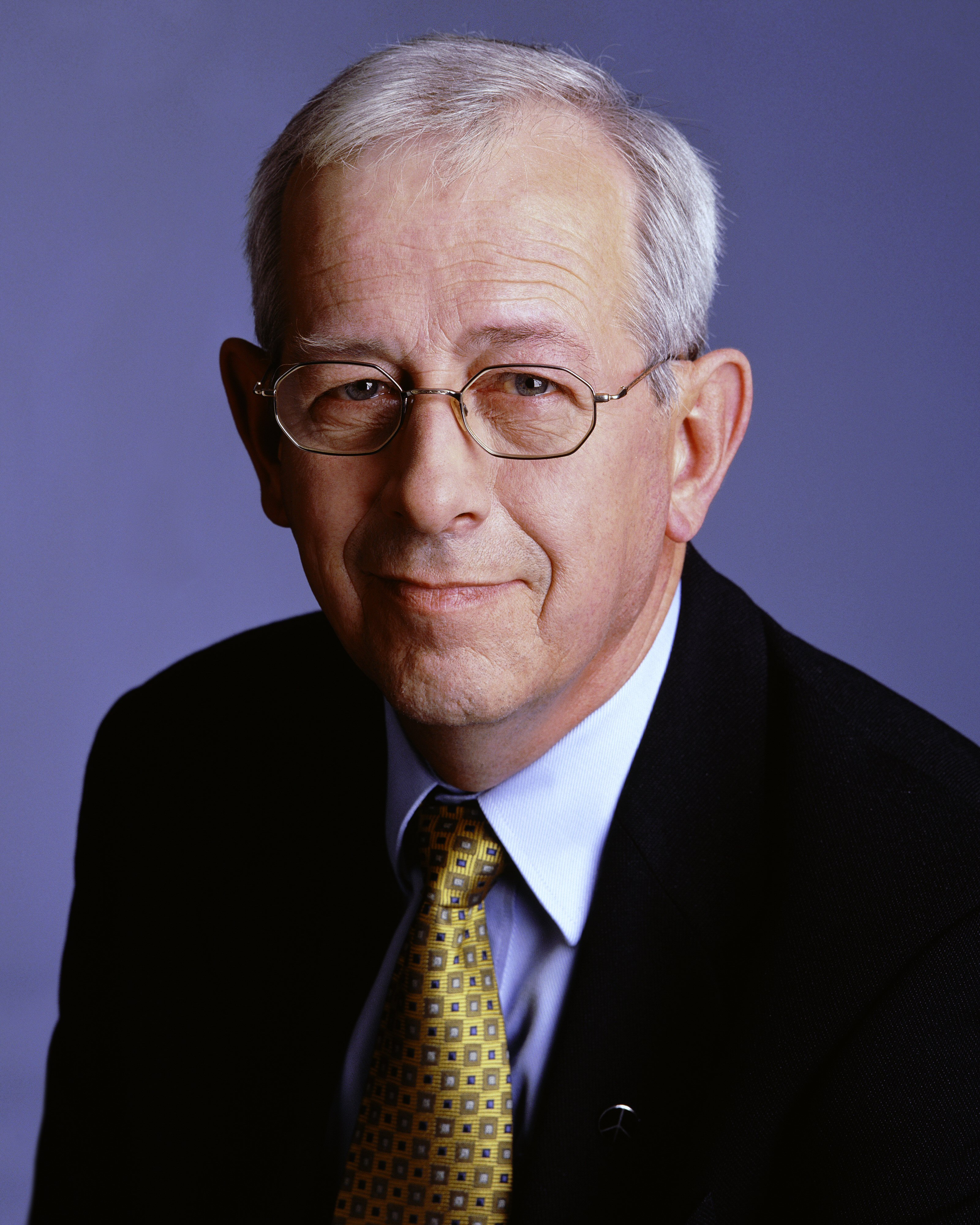
Emmet Stagg

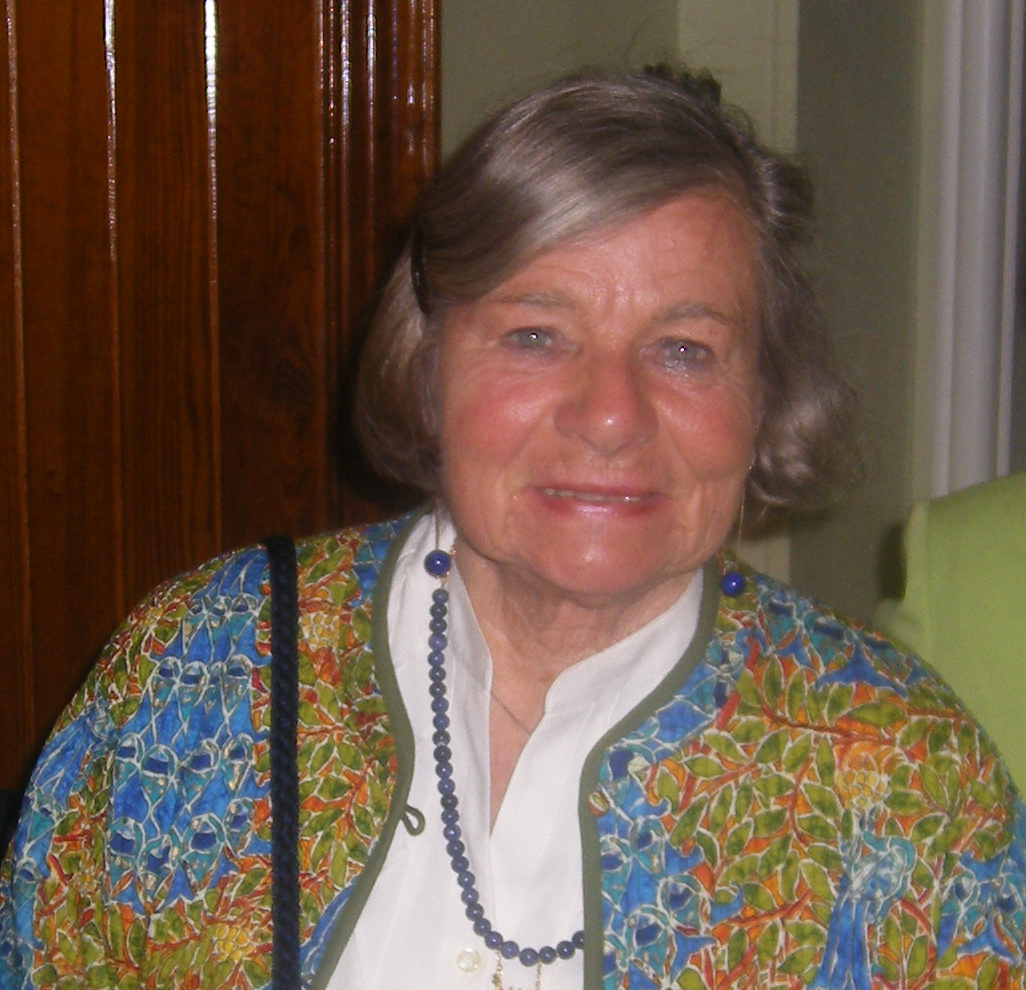
Imogen Stuart

- 3 March – Dan McCartan, 84, Gaelic footballer (Glenn, Down senior team, Ulster). Born in Northern Ireland.
- 5 March – Sonia Hoey, 43, footballer (Peamount United, Dundalk City) and Gaelic footballer (Dowdallshill, Louth senior team).
- 6 March – Nick Sheridan, 32, journalist and television presenter (News2day, Reporting Scotland, The Nine)
- 9 March – Vince Power, 76, music festival promoter.
- 11 March – Charlie Bird, 74, broadcast journalist, motor neurone disease.
- 15 March – Emmet Bergin, 79, actor.
- 17 March
  - Emmet Stagg, 79, politician, TD (1987–2016) and Minister of State (1993–1994 and 1994–1997).
  - Niall McEneaney, 44, hurler (Mattock Rangers, Louth senior team) and hurling coach (St Fechin's).
- 18 March
  - Rose Dugdale, 82, heiress and paramilitary leader (Provisional IRA). Born in England.
  - Pearse McAuley, 59, paramilitary (Provisional IRA) and convicted criminal. Born in Northern Ireland.
- 21 March – Ger Brady, 44, Gaelic footballer (Ballina Stephenites, Mayo senior team), motor neurone disease.
- 25 March
  - Michael Coady, 84, poet.
  - Imogen Stuart, 96, sculptor. Born in Germany.
- 30 March – Dick Dowling, 85, politician, senator (1982) and TD (1982–1987).

=== April ===
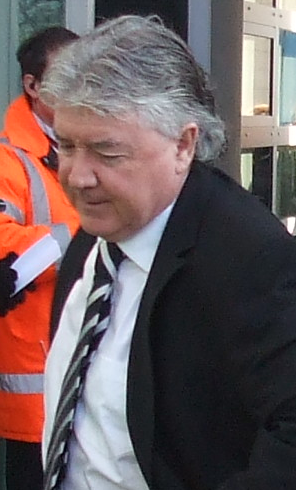
Joe Kinnear

- 4 April – Steve Duggan, 76, Gaelic footballer (Ballyhaise, Cavan senior team, Ulster).
- 7 April – Joe Kinnear, 77, footballer (Tottenham Hotspur, national team) and manager (Wimbledon, Newcastle United).
- 14 April
  - Larry Masterson, 74, television producer.
  - Frank O'Neill, 70, footballer (Cobh Ramblers, Cork Celtic).
  - Sam Nolan, 93, trade union activist.
- 15 April – Gerard Murphy, 73, politician, TD (2002–2007).
- 17 April – Alf McCarthy, 73, broadcaster and actor.
- 19 April – Tony Whyte, 85, Gaelic footballer and manager (Clann na nGael, Roscommon senior team).
- 22 April
  - Tony Felloni, 81, drug dealer.
  - Charlie Hurley, 87, footballer (Millwall, Sunderland, Bolton Wanderers, national team) and manager (Reading).
- 23 April – Dan Harnedy, 82, Gaelic footballer (Castlemagner, Éire Óg, Carlow Town Hurling Club, University College Cork, Cork senior team).

=== May ===
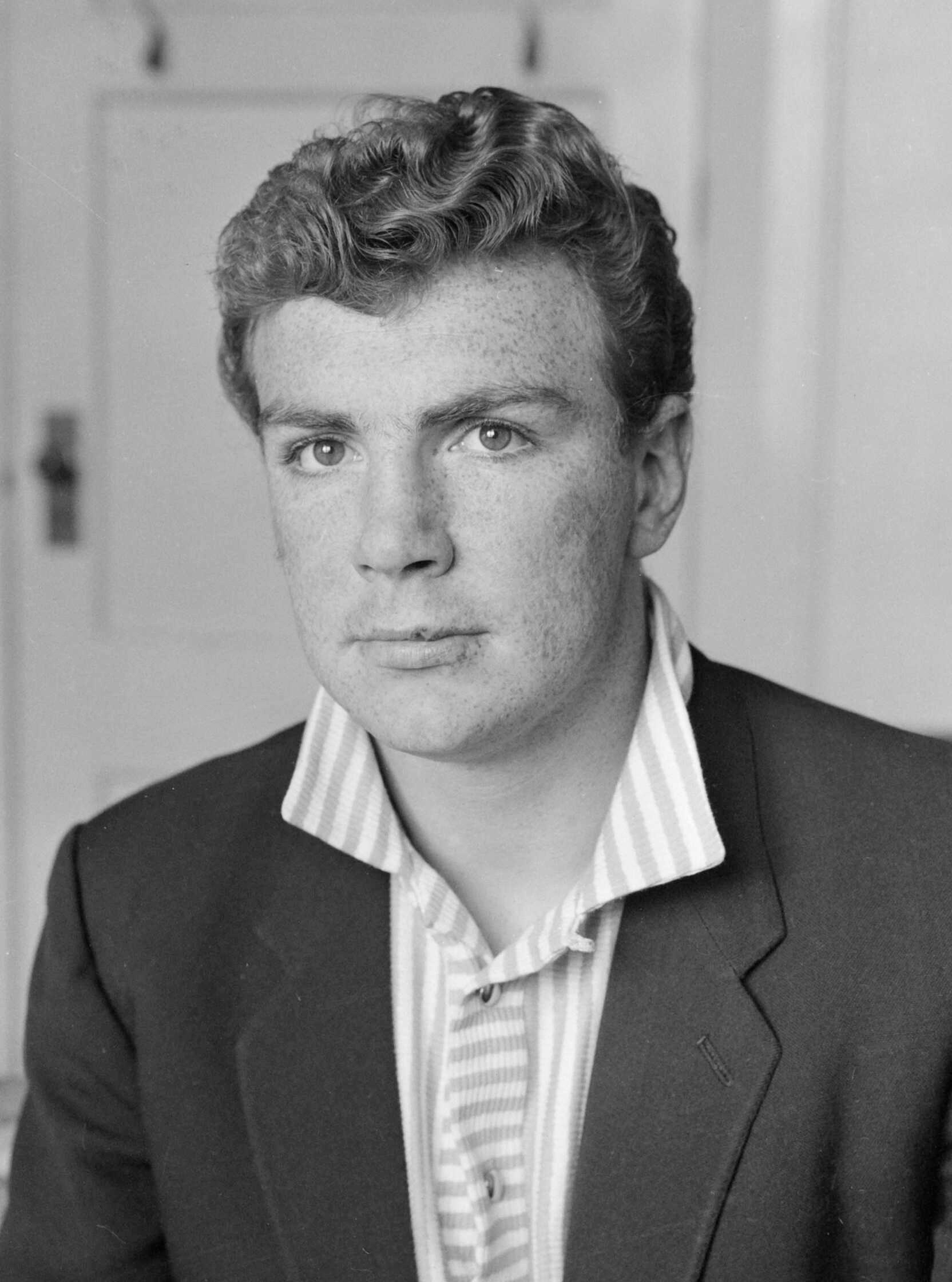
Tony O'Reilly

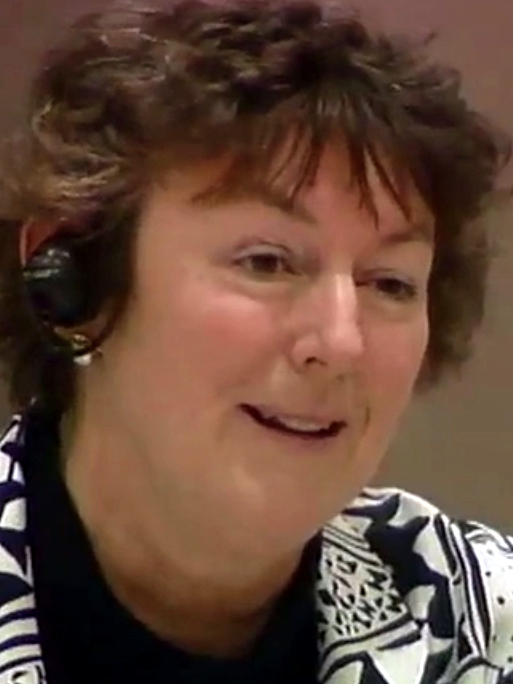
Mary Banotti

- 1 May – Michael D'Arcy, 90, politician, TD (1977–1987, 1989–1992 and 1997–2002) and senator (1993–1997).
- 2 May – Bruce Arnold, 87, writer and journalist. Born in England.
- 4 May – Ron Kavana, 73, singer, songwriter, guitarist and band leader.
- 5 May – Columba Cryan, 94, Gaelic footballer (Ballinamore Seán O'Heslin's, Leitrim senior team, Connacht).
- 8 May
  - George Lavery, 93, Gaelic footballer (Kilwarlin, Down senior team, Ulster) and selector (Down senior team). Born in Northern Ireland.
  - Brian Phelan, 89, actor, dramatist and screenwriter. (Death announced on this date)
- 10 May – Mary Banotti, 84, politician, MEP (1984–2004).
- 17 May – Pat Buckley, 72, Independent Catholic bishop.
- 18 May – Tony O'Reilly, 88, businessman and rugby union player (Leinster, national team).
- 20 May – Fran Rooney, 67, footballer (Shamrock Rovers, St Patrick's Athletic), manager (women's national team), FAI chief executive and businessman.
- 26 May – Joseph Brennan, 82, baker, founder of the Brennan's Bread company.
- 29 May – Gerald Dawe, 72, poet, academic and literary critic.
- 31 May – Seán Óg Sheehy, 85, Gaelic footballer (John Mitchels, Kerry senior team, Munster).

=== June ===
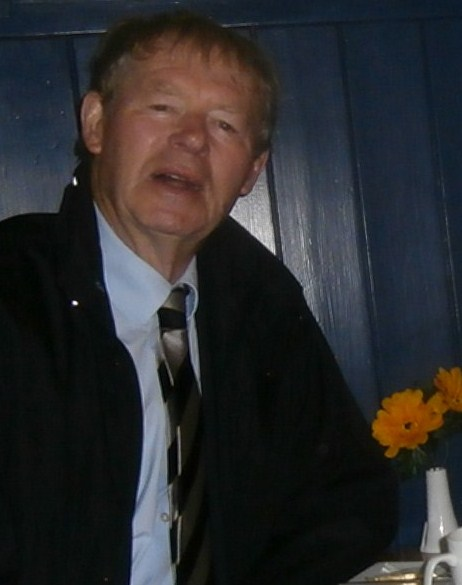
Micheál Ó Muircheartaigh

- 8 June – Charlie Lennon, 85, fiddler, composer and pianist.
- 15 June – Eugene Davis, 70, footballer (Shamrock Rovers, Athlone Town, St Patrick's Athletic, Bray Wanderers).
- 17 June – Paul Coyle, 56, Gaelic footballer (Devenish St Mary's, Swatragh, Fermanagh senior team). Born in Northern Ireland.
- 23 June – Bernard Allen, 79, politician, TD (1981–2011) and Minister of State (1994–1997).
- 24 June – Mike Farnan, 83, Canadian-based politician, Ontario MPP (1987–1995) and Solicitor General of Ontario (1990–1991).
- 25 June
  - Mícheál Ó Muircheartaigh, 93, Gaelic games commentator.
  - Tommie Gorman, 68, journalist.
- 29 June – Ralph Prendergast, 87, hurler (Claughaun, Limerick senior team).

=== July ===
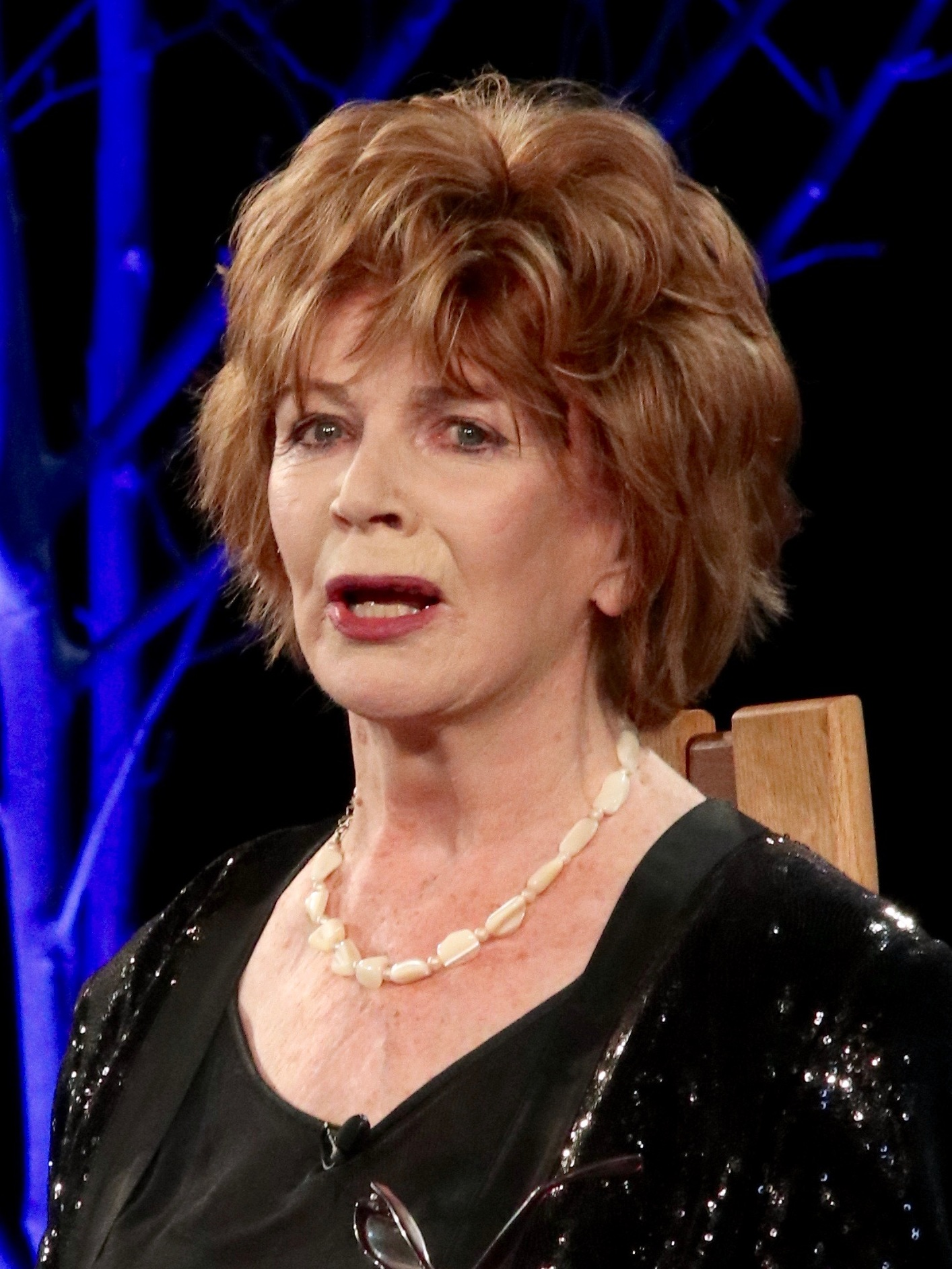
Edna O'Brien

- 6 July – John O'Mahony, 71, Gaelic football manager (Galway senior team) and politician, TD (2007–2016) and senator (2016–2020).
- 7 July
  - Hugh Geoghegan, 86, judge.
  - Peter O'Sullivan, 81, hurler (Cashel King Cormacs, Tipperary senior team, Munster).
- 8 July – David Power, 77, bookmaker.
- 9 July – Barry Studdert, 85, Gaelic footballer (St Finbarr's, Cork senior team).
- 10 July – Hughie Travers, 81, Gaelic footballer (Four Masters, Donegal senior team).
- 11 July – Tommy Drennan, 82, singer.
- 14 July – Richie Browne, 89, hurler (Castletownroche, Avondhu, Cork senior team).
- 20 July – Pádraig O'Neill, 58, Gaelic footballer (Cooley Kickhams, Armagh senior team, Louth senior team).
- 27 July – Edna O'Brien, 93, writer.

=== August ===
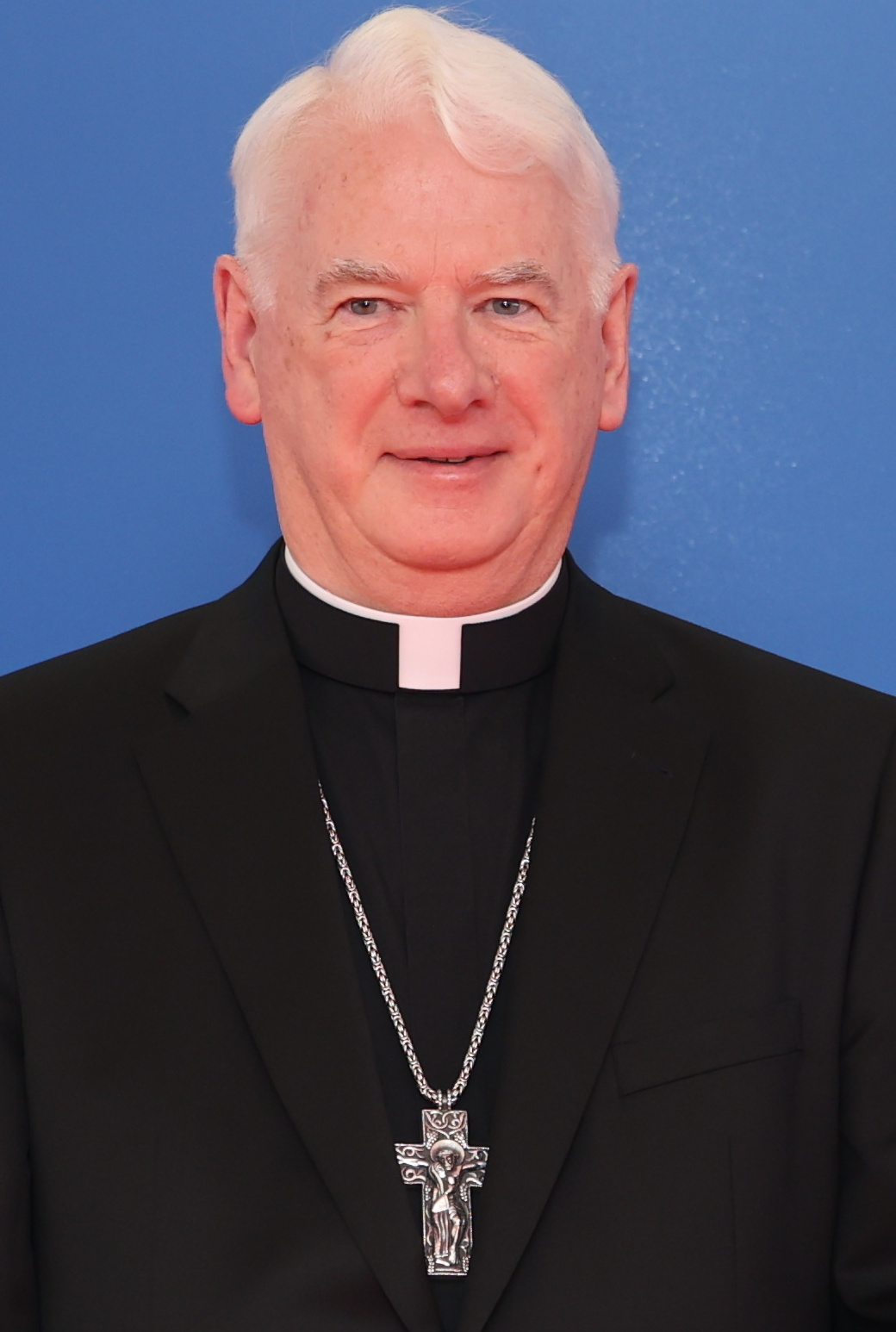
Noël Treanor

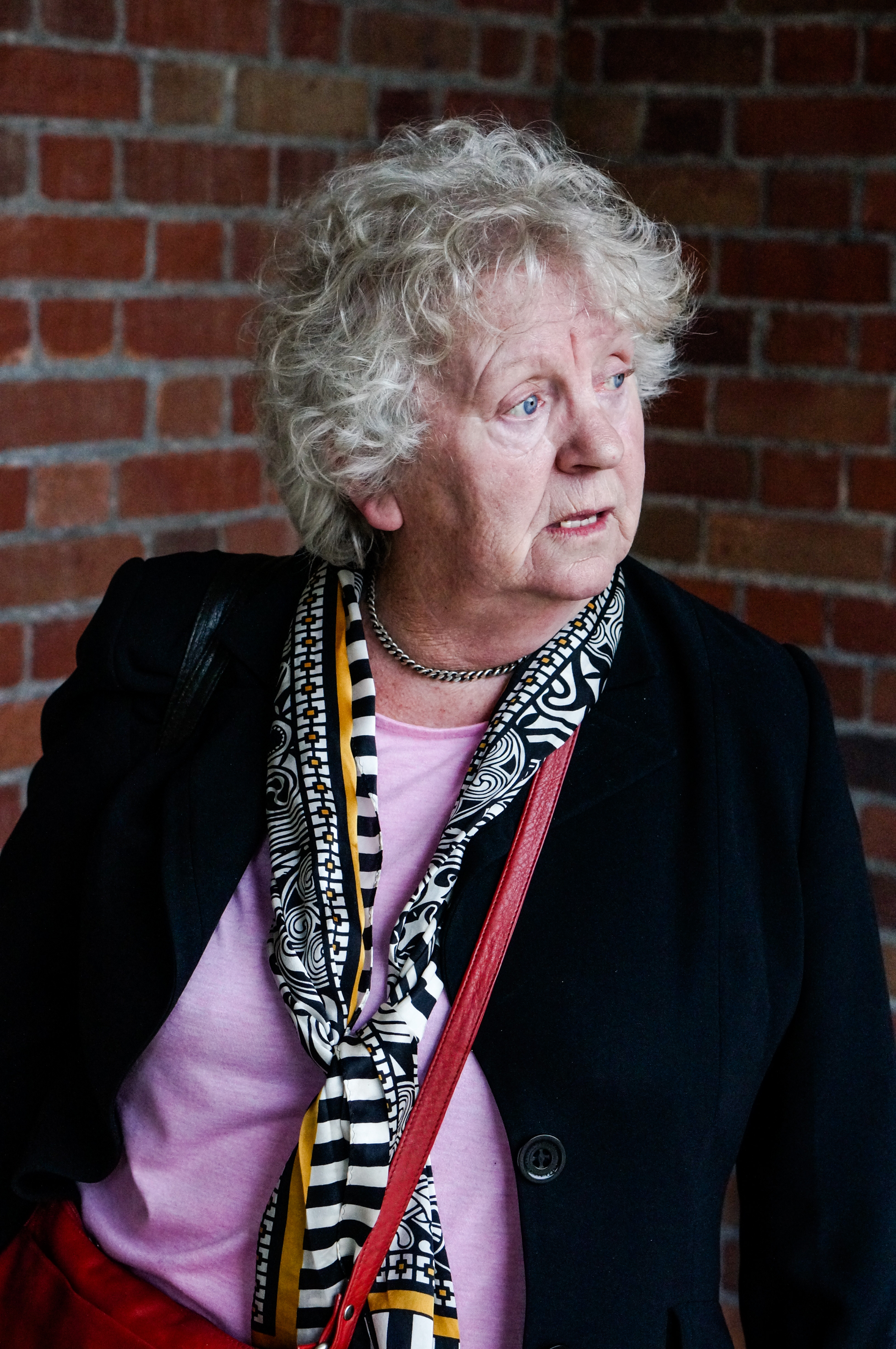
Nell McCafferty

- 3 August – Jody O'Neill, 87, Gaelic footballer (Coalisland, Tyrone senior team, Ulster) and manager (Tyrone senior team). Born in Northern Ireland.
- 4 August – Martin Heavey, 82, Gaelic footballer (Rhode, Offaly senior team).
- 7 August – Mick McCarthy, 75, hurler (Na Piarsaigh, University College Cork, Cork senior team).
- 9 August – Rory Burke, 30, rugby union player (Cork Constitution, Munster, Nottingham, Connacht).
- 10 August – Liam Munroe, 90, footballer (Shamrock Rovers, Ards, Dundalk, national team).
- 11 August
  - Éamonn Fitzpatrick, 73, hurler (University College Cork, St Finbarr's, Cork senior team).
  - Douglas Goodwin, 86, cricketer (national team).
  - Noël Treanor, 73, Roman Catholic prelate.
  - Eoin French (who performed as Talos), 36, musician.
- 18 August – Kevin Kehilly, 74, Gaelic footballer (Newcestown, Cork senior team, Munster).
- 21 August
  - Nell McCafferty, 80, journalist, playwright, civil rights campaigner and feminist.
  - Eddie McKay, 86, Gaelic footballer (Dundrum, Down senior team). Born in Northern Ireland.
- 22 August – Jim Crowley, 94, Gaelic footballer (St Vincent's, Dublin senior team).
- 25 August – Brian Seeley, 90, Gaelic footballer (Clan na Gael, Armagh senior team) and manager (Clan na Gael). Born in Northern Ireland.

=== September ===
- 2 September – Pádraic Monaghan, 65, Gaelic footballer (Garrymore, University College Galway, Mayo senior team).
- 7 September – James Byrne, 77, criminal.
- 15 September – Jack Fagan, 85, journalist and Gaelic footballer (Navan O'Mahonys, Meath senior team).
- 16 September – Pascal Flynn, 87, Gaelic footballer (St Mary's, Dublin senior team).
- 18 September – Toto Schillaci, 59, Italian association footballer and figure in Irish footballing folklore whose goal in a 1990 World Cup quarter final match ended Ireland's most successful run in a major international football competition and broke their dreams of proceeding further in the tournament.
- 21 September – Brian Bermingham, 77, politician, councillor (1979–2014) and Lord Mayor of Cork (2008–2009).

=== October ===
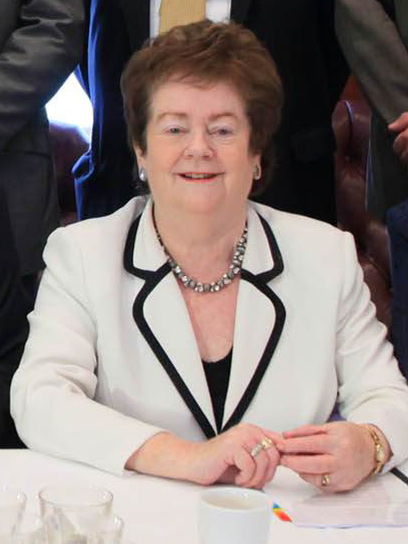
Mary O'Rourke

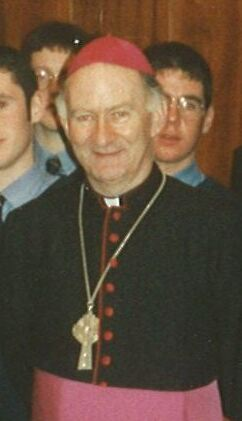
Donal Murray

- 3 October – Mary O'Rourke, 87, politician, TD (1982–2002 and 2007–2011), senator (1981–1982 and 2002–2007) and Leader of the Seanad (2002–2007).
- 6 October – Hugh Patrick Slattery, 90, Roman Catholic prelate, Bishop of Tzaneen (1984–2010).
- 11 October
  - Mick Crotty, 78, hurler (James Stephens, Kilkenny senior team, Leinster).
  - Ronnie Dawson, 92, rugby union player (Wanderers, Leinster, national team) and coach (British Lions).
- 13 October – Donal Murray, 84, Roman Catholic prelate, Bishop of Limerick (1996–2009).
- 14 October – Richard Conroy, 91, businessman and politician, senator (1977–1981 and 1989–1993).
- 16 October – Roy Walsh, 75, Provisional IRA volunteer and convicted criminal (1973 Old Bailey bombing). Born in Northern Ireland.
- 17 October – Tom Garvin, 81, political scientist and historian.
- 19 October – Joe Gaston, 93, rugby union player (Dublin University, Ulster, national team). Born in Northern Ireland.
- 21 October – Michael Reade, 58, broadcaster.
- 29 October – P. J. Carroll, 80, Gaelic footballer (Cavan Gaels, Cavan senior team) and manager (Leitrim, Sligo, Cavan).
- 31 October – David Davin-Power, 72, broadcast journalist (RTÉ News).

=== November ===
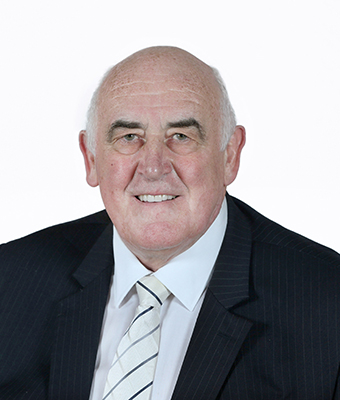
Billy Lawless

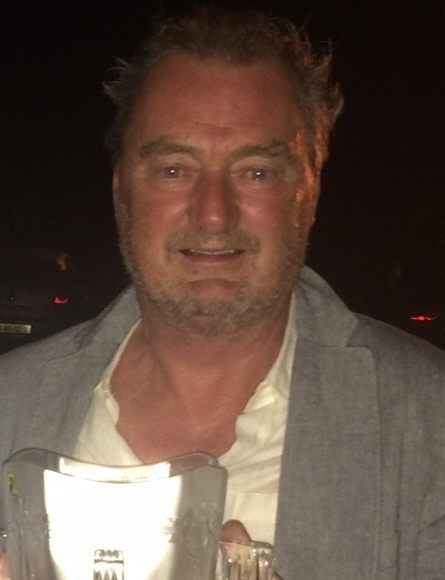
Jon Kenny

- 5 November – Mick Waters, 83, hurler (Blackrock, Cork senior team).
- 6 November – John Dempsey, 78, English-born footballer (Chelsea, Fulham, national team).
- 7 November – Kathleen Watkins, 90, broadcaster, harpist, actress, singer and author.
- 8 November – Billy Lawless, 73, politician, senator (2016–2020).
- 10 November
  - Noel Tierney, 82, Gaelic footballer (Milltown, Galway senior team, Connacht).
  - Michael Hogan, 56, hurler (Birr, Offaly senior team).
- 12 November – Johnny Duhan, 74, singer-songwriter.
- 13 November – Doireann MacDermott, 100, translator, writer and academic.
- 14 November – Dervilla M. X. Donnelly, 94, chemist and academic.
- 15 November – Jon Kenny, 66, comedian and actor.
- 20 November – Ita Beausang, 88, musicologist and educator.
- 26 November – Gemma Hussey, 86, politician, senator (1977–1982), TD (1982–1989) and Minister for Education (1982–1986).
- 29 November – Pádraig Nally, 81, farmer who was acquitted of the killing of an intruder on his land in 2004.

=== December ===
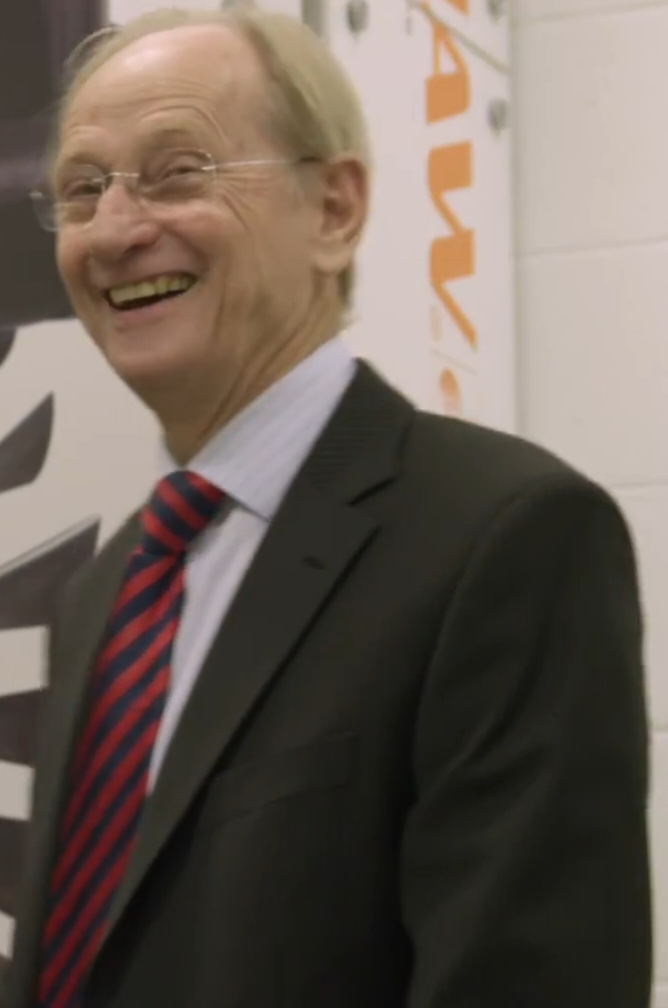
David McMurtry

- 5 December – Cyril Dunne, 83, Gaelic footballer (St Grellan's, Galway senior team, Connacht) and manager (St Grellan's, Galway senior team).
- 6 December
  - Andrew Boylan, 85, politician, TD (1987–2002).
  - Dickie Rock, 88, singer.
- 9 December
  - Jody Gormley, 54, Gaelic footballer (Bredagh, Tyrone senior team) and manager (Trillick). Born in Northern Ireland.
  - David McMurtry, 84, businessman.
- 10 December – Raghnall Ó Floinn, art historian.
- 13 December
  - Charles Handy, 92, organizational behaviorist.
  - Mick Minogue, 88, hurler (Roscrea, Tipperary senior team and coach (Moneygall, Tipperary senior team).
  - Freddie Strahan, 85, footballer (Shelbourne, St Patrick's Athletic, national team) and manager (Shelbourne).
- 15 December – Chris Murphy, 56, Gaelic footballer (St Paul's, Clan na Gael, Antrim senior team). Born in Northern Ireland.
- 17 December – Kevin Kelly, 79, Gaelic footballer (Carbury, Athlone, Kildare senior team).
- 18 December – Patrick Conolly-Carew, 7th Baron Carew, 86, Olympic equestrian (1972) and hereditary peer, member of the House of Lords (1994–1999).
- 19 December
  - Martin Óg Morrissey, 90, hurler (Mount Sion, Waterford senior team, Munster).
  - Patrick O'Donnell, 59, Gaelic footballer (Banagher, Derry senior team). Born in Northern Ireland.
- 20 December – Gearóid Ó Cairealláin, 67, Irish language activist, editor and president of Conradh na Gaeilge (1995–1998). Born in Northern Ireland.
- 23 December – Mick Fleming, 91, hurler (St Senan's, Kilkenny senior team).
- 24 December – Tom Hyland, 72, human rights activist.
- 30 December – Paddy Hill, 80, human rights campaigner, wrongfully convicted of the 1974 Birmingham pub bombings. Born in Northern Ireland.
