= 1930 All-Ireland Junior Hurling Championship =

All Ireland Champions
- Winners: Tipperary (5th win)
- Captain: Paddy Harty

All Ireland Runners-up
- Runners-up: Kilkenny
- Captain: Peter O'Reilly

Provincial Champions
- Munster: Tipperary
- Leinster: Kilkenny
- Ulster: Not Played
- Connacht: Galway

The 1930 All-Ireland Junior Hurling Championship was the 13th staging of the All-Ireland Junior Championship since its establishment by the Gaelic Athletic Association in 1912.

Offaly entered the championship as the defending champions.

The All-Ireland final was played on 23 November 1930 at Waterford Sportsfield, between Tipperary and Kilkenny, in what was their first meeting in a final since 1928. Tipperary won the match by 8-06 to 3-02 to claim their fifth championship title overall and a first title since 1926. Having earlier claimed the senior and minor titles, Tipperary became the first team to win the so called "Triple Crown" of hurling.

== Results ==
=== All-Ireland Junior Hurling Championship ===
==== All-Ireland quarter-final ====
14 September 1930 Quarter-final	London	4-01 - 3-02	Galway	Croke Park

==== All-Ireland semi-finals ====
28 September 1930 Semi-final	Kilkenny	4-01 - 1-04	Antirm	Croke Park

19 October 1930 Semi-final	Tipperary	11-05 - 1-00	London	Croke Park

==== All-Ireland final ====
23 November 1930 Final	Tipperary	6-02 - 2-03	Kilkenny	Waterford Sportsfield
