= 1928 All-Ireland Junior Hurling Championship final =

1928 All-Ireland Junior Hurling Final
- Event: 1928 All-Ireland Junior Hurling Championship
Kilkenny	Tipperary
4-6	4-4
- Date: 5 May 1929
- City: Waterford

The 1928 All-Ireland Junior Hurling Championship Final was the ??th All-Ireland Final and the culmination of the 1928 All-Ireland Junior Hurling Championship, an inter-county hurling tournament for teams in Ireland. The match was held on 5 May 1929 between Tipperary and Kilkenny.

== Match details ==
5 May 1929

Kilkenny	4-6 – 4-4	Tipperary

Waterford
Attendance: 14,000
