= 1929 All-Ireland Junior Hurling Championship =

All Ireland Champions
- Winners: Offaly (2nd win)
- Captain: P. J. Grogan

All Ireland Runners-up
- Runners-up: Cork
- Captain: E. O'Connor

Provincial Champions
- Munster: Cork
- Leinster: Offaly
- Ulster: Not Played
- Connacht: Galway

The 1929 All-Ireland Junior Hurling Championship was the 12th staging of the All-Ireland Junior Championship since its establishment by the Gaelic Athletic Association in 1912.

Kilkenny entered the championship as the defending champions, however, they were beaten in the Leinster Championship.

The All-Ireland final was played on 15 December 1929 at Thurles Sportsfield, between Offaly and Cork in what was their meeting in the final in six years. Offaly won the match by 6-01 to 2-03 to claim their second championship title overall and a first title since 1923.

== Results ==
=== All-Ireland Junior Hurling Championship ===
==== All-Ireland quarter-final ====
| 22 September 1929 Quarter-final | Cork | 3-08 - 1-01 | Antrim | Croke Park |

==== All-Ireland semi-finals ====
| 6 October 1929 Semi-final | Offaly | 10-04 - 3-00 | Galway | St. Brendan's Park |

| 18 November 1929 Semi-final | Cork | 3-02 - 1-00 | Lancashire | Croke Park |

==== All-Ireland final ====
| 15 December 1929 Final | Offaly | 6-01 - 2-03 | Cork | Thurles Sportsfield |
