= Johnston Mooney and O'Brien =

Irish bakery company

Johnston Mooney & O'Brien
- Type: Privately held company
- Industry: Baking
- Founded: 1835
- Headquarters: Dublin, Ireland
- Products: Baked goods
- Website: https://www.jmob.ie/

Johnston Mooney and O'Brien is Ireland's oldest baking company, founded in 1835. Its products are distributed nationwide by 120 distributors.

== History ==
The business was founded as Johnston's Bakery in 1835 in Ballsbridge, Dublin. Later in the 19th century, it merged with Mooney's Bakery and O'Brien's Bakery to form Johnston Mooney and O'Brien. By the 1890s, the business began specialising in wedding cakes and birthday cakes, which were made to order.

By the 1920s, the business had ten cake and bread shops located throughout Dublin, in Cabra, Camden Street, Capel Street, Dominick Street, Dún Laoghaire, Finglas, Kimmage, Parnell Square, Rathmines and Stillorgan. The business also operated the Clonliffe Flour Mills on Jones Road, Dublin.

In 1931-1932, the business constructed a new bakehouse in Ballsbridge partially on the site of the former Dublin by Lamplight laundry. In 1935-1936, it constructed a second bakehouse at 7-8 Leinster Street South in Dublin city centre.

Johnston Mooney and O'Brien was the first bakery to introduce the sliced pan to Ireland, in the 1930s. In the 1960s, the business replaced its horse-drawn delivery vans with a fleet of electric vans. In 1975, the business launched the Bundy's sub-brand, which specialises in burger buns, hot dog rolls, baps and similar products.

=== Liquidation ===
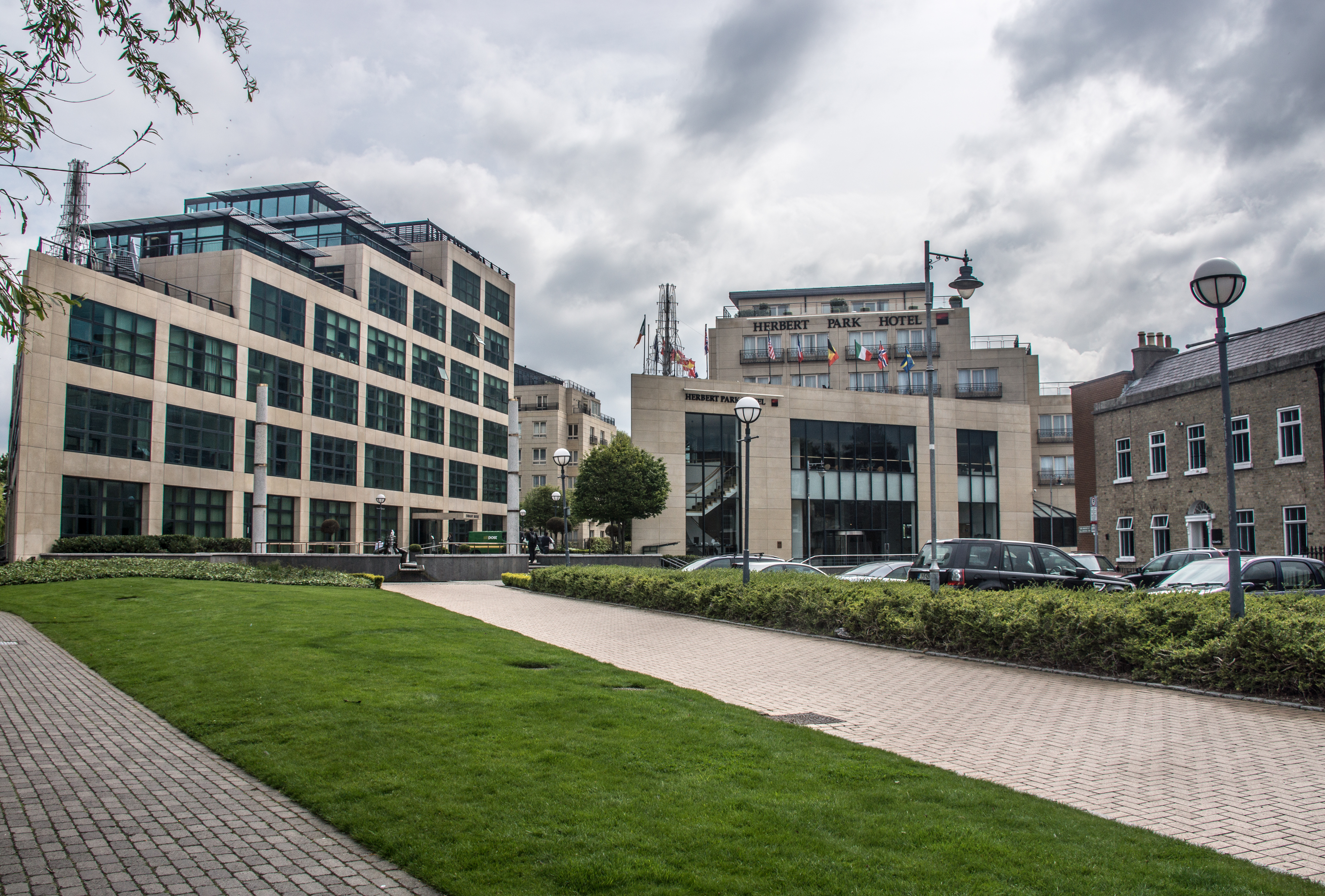
Herbert Park Hotel in Ballsbridge, formerly the manufacturing facility of Johnston Mooney and O'Brien.

In February 1989, in the context of a national supermarket price war (which itself had led to the collapse of the H Williams supermarket chain in 1987), it was announced that Johnston Mooney and O'Brien's bakery in Ballsbridge was to close after some 150 years in operation. At that time, the business had 485 direct employees in addition to its self-employed delivery drivers. The company was placed into voluntary liquidation by its parent company Odlums Group in February 1989.

=== Glackin report ===
The sale of the site was later subject to the Glackin Report in 1992-93 which found that Dermot Desmond , J. P. McManus and John Magnier were beneficiaries of the sale of the site to the then state body Telecom Éireann. The site had earlier been purchased by Desmond for £4 million from the liquidator in April 1989 before being sold on to a company named Chestvale in September 1989 and shortly thereafter to Telecom Éireann for £9.4 million. The Herbert Park Hotel and Park Place offices and apartments were later built on the site.

=== New ownership ===
Clonee Bakeries, led by Chairman Peter Lyons, acquired the Johnston Mooney & O’Brien and Buttercrust brands out of liquidation in March 1989. In the 1990s, the business moved its bread plant to Jamestown Road, Finglas.

As of 2003, the business employed 206 people. The number employed fell to 195 in 2004. As of December 2025, the business continues to operate two bakeries, with a bread plant in Finglas, Dublin, and its Bundy's plant in Clonee, County Meath.

Johnston Mooney and O'Brien's main competitors include Brennans Bread and Pat the Baker.
