= Ireland–Palestine relations =

Bilateral relations between Ireland and Palestine

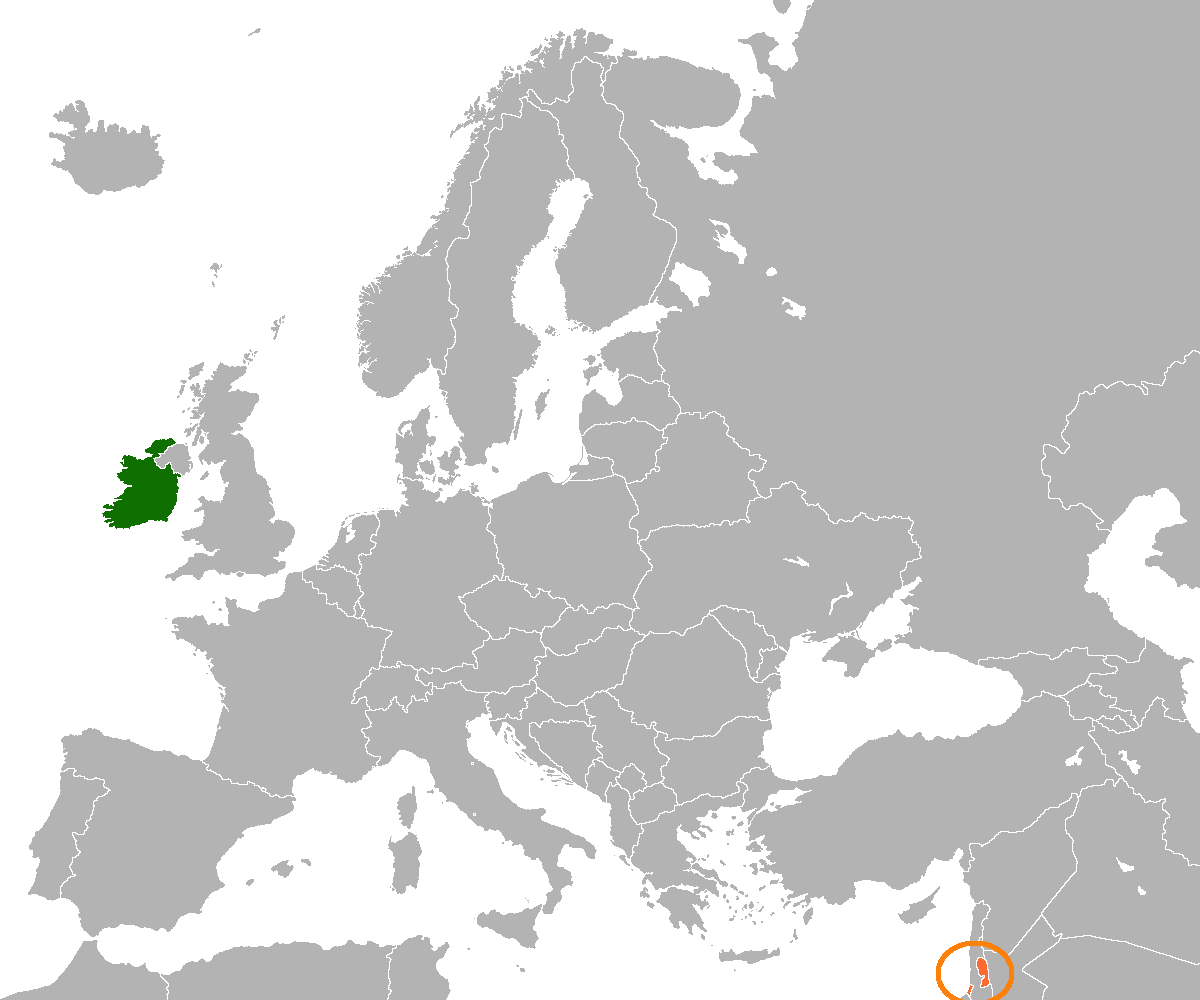

- Ireland: Palestine

Diplomatic mission
- Palestinian Embassy, Dublin: Representative Office of Ireland, Ramallah

Envoy
- Ambassador Jilan Wahba Abdalmajid: Representative Felim McLaughlin

Ireland–Palestine relations are the bilateral and historical relations between Ireland and Palestine. In 2000, Ireland established a representative office in Ramallah and Palestine has an embassy in Dublin. Both countries are members of the Union for the Mediterranean.

In late 2024, Ireland announced it would join South Africa's Gaza genocide case against Israel in the International Court of Justice.

Irish politicians have met with leaders of both Hamas and the Palestinian Authority. While Taoiseach, Leo Varadkar criticized European Union president Ursula von der Leyen for her pro-Israel stance.

== History ==
In 1969, Irish Foreign Minister Frank Aiken called resolving the conflict in the Middle East as Ireland's "most pressing" foreign policy objective. In 2024, Jane Ohlmeyer, a history professor at Trinity College Dublin, noted the tendency to see the conflict through the prism of Northern Ireland, where "republican nationalists sympathize with Palestine and loyalists, unionists with Israel".

In 1980, Ireland was the first European Union member state to endorse the establishment of a Palestinian state.

In 1999 Taoiseach Bertie Ahern went on a two-day trip to Gaza where he met with Yasser Arafat and visited the Jabaliya refugee camp. He became the first leader of a nation to fly from Palestine to their home country. In 2001, the State of Palestine opened a mission in Ireland with Ali Hamineh as its first Delegate-general. In September 2001 Minister for Foreign Affairs Brian Cowen travelled to Gaza and met with Arafat.

In 2009, Hamas leader and then-Palestinian Prime Minister Ismail Haniyeh invited Gerry Adams, the leader of the Irish Sinn Féin party, to Gaza. Adams and his delegation met with Haniyeh on 9 April 2009; Adams praised him as a negotiator and would later go on to condemn Haniyeh's assassination by Israel.

In January 2011, Ireland accorded the Palestinian delegation in Dublin diplomatic status. A few months later, their Foreign Affairs Minister stated that Ireland would recognize Palestinian statehood, but not until the PNA was in full control over its territories. In October 2014, the Upper House of the Irish Parliament unanimously passed a motion calling on the Government to recognize the State of Palestine. In December 2014, the Lower House of Ireland's Parliament followed suit. However, the government said it would recognize Palestine only as part of a broader EU initiative.

During the 2021 Israel–Palestine crisis, the Dáil called Israel's de facto annexation of Palestine illegal.

On 22 May 2024, amid increasing international criticism of Israel's actions in the Gaza war, the Irish Government announced that it recognised the State of Palestine, in a coordinated action with the governments of Norway and Spain. The move was criticised by Israeli Foreign Minister, Israel Katz who announced the recall of the Israeli Ambassador, Dana Erlich.

With the United States being seen as a staunch ally of Israel in the Gaza war, the then Irish Taoiseach, Leo Varadkar, had acknowledged a "differences of opinions in relation [between the US and Ireland] to Israel and Gaza", particularly regarding the Israeli bombardment of Gaza.

Formal diplomatic relations between the Ireland and the State of Palestine were established on 29 September 2024 through an exchange of diplomatic notes. In October 2024, the government of the State of Palestine formally notified the Irish Department of Foreign Affairs of its intention to change Palestine’s representation to a resident embassy under the Vienna Convention on Diplomatic Relations. In November 2024, the Irish government approved the appointment of Jilan Wahba Abdalmajid as the Palestinian ambassador to Ireland.

== See also ==
- Foreign relations of Ireland
- Foreign relations of Palestine
