= 1948 All-Ireland Junior Hurling Championship =

All Ireland Champions
- Winners: Meath (2nd win)

All Ireland Runners-up
- Runners-up: London

Provincial Champions
- Munster: Limerick
- Leinster: Meath
- Ulster: Donegal
- Connacht: Galway

The 1948 All-Ireland Junior Hurling Championship was the 27th staging of the All-Ireland Junior Championship since its establishment by the Gaelic Athletic Association in 1912.

Cork entered the championship as the defending champions, however, they were beaten by Limerick in the Munster final.

The All-Ireland final replay was played on 31 October 1948 at Páirc Tailteann in Navan, between Meath and London, in what was their first ever meeting in the final. Meath won the match by 2-07 to 2-05 to claim their second championship title overall and a first title in 21 years.

== Results ==
=== All-Ireland Junior Hurling Championship ===
==== All-Ireland semi-finals ====
22 August 1948 Semi-final	Limerick	4-05 - 2-05	Galway	Gaelic Grounds

29 August 1948 Semi-final	Meath	8-11 - 1-01	Donegal	St. Loman's Park

==== All-Ireland home final ====
19 September 1948 Home final	Meath	5-09 - 2-01	Limerick	O'Moore Park

==== All-Ireland finals ====
10 October 1948 Final	London	3-05 - 3-05	Metah	New Eltham

31 October 1948 Final replay	Meath	2-07 - 2-05	London	Páirc Tailteann
