= 1949 All-Ireland Junior Hurling Championship =

All Ireland Champions
- Winners: London (2nd win)

All Ireland Runners-up
- Runners-up: Clare

Provincial Champions
- Munster: Clare
- Leinster: Kilkenny
- Ulster: Armagh
- Connacht: Galway

The 1949 All-Ireland Junior Hurling Championship was the 28th staging of the All-Ireland Junior Championship since its establishment by the Gaelic Athletic Association in 1912.

Meath entered the championship as the defending champions, however, they were beaten in the Leinster Championship.

The All-Ireland final was played on 9 October 1949 at Cusack Park in Ennis, between London and Clare, in what was their first ever meeting in the final. London won the match by 3–07 to 3–06 to claim their second championship title overall and a first title in 11 years.

== Results ==
=== All-Ireland Junior Hurling Championship ===
==== All-Ireland semi-finals ====
14 August 1949 Semi-final	Armagh	2-03 - 4-06	Clare	Athletic Grounds

21 August 1949 Semi-final	Kilkenny	5-07 - 3-03	Galway	Nowlan Park

==== All-Ireland home final ====
18 September 1949 Home final	Clare	3-05 - 3-03	Kilkenny	MacDonagh Park

==== All-Ireland finals ====
9 October 1949 Final	Clare	3-06 - 3-07	London	Cusack Park
