= Donal O'Grady (Clare hurler) =

Irish hurler (1927–2024)

Personal information
- Native name: Donal Ó Gráda (Irish)
- Born: 23 November 1927 Tubber, County Clare, Ireland
- Died: 20 January 2024 (aged 96) Newmarket-on-Fergus, County Clare, Ireland
- Occupation: Office manager

Sport
- Sport: Hurling
- Position: Centre-back
Clubs
- Years: Club
- Tubber; Faughs
Inter-county
- Years: County
- 1948-1956: Clare
Inter-county titles
- Munster titles: 0
- All-Irelands: 0
- NHL: 0

Donal O'Grady (23 November 1927 – 20 January 2024) was an Irish hurler. At club level he played with Tubber and Faughs and was also a member of the Clare senior hurling team.

== Career ==
O'Grady first appeared on the inter-county scene for Clare as a member of the minor team in 1945. After a period away from the game, he returned to inter-county activity in 1948. O'Grady won a Munster JHC medal a year later, however, Clare subsequently suffered a 3–07 to 3–06 defeat by London in the 1949 All-Ireland junior final.

O'Grady immediately progressed onto the senior team and won an Oireachtas Cup medal in 1954. He lined out in the 1955 Munster final defeat by Limerick. O'Grady also earned selection to the Munster team and won Railway Cup medals in 1953 and 1955. His career with Clare ended in 1956 when he moved to Dublin, however, he continued his club hurling with Faughs.

== Coaching career ==
O'Grady was appointed a selector to the Clare senior hurling team in July 1989.

== Personal life and death ==
O'Grady was born in Tubber, County Clare in November 1927. He joined the Royal Air Force at the age of 18 and spent three years in England and Germany. O'Grady emigrated to Luton and worked as a stores manager with General Motors in the late 1950s. He later returned to Clare and worked in O'Connor Engineering as office manager. O'Grady's nephews, Enda and Patrick O'Connor, were part of Clare's National Hurling League-winning teams in 1977 and 1978. His grandnephew, Patrick O'Connor, won an All-Ireland SHC medal with Clare in 2013.

O'Grady died on 20 January 2024, at the age of 96.

== Honours ==
Clare

- Oireachtas Cup: 1954
- Munster Junior Hurling Championship: 1949

Munster

- Railway Cup: 1953, 1955
