= Pat the Baker =

Irish bread-making company

- Company logo
- Company type: Privately held company
- Industry: Baking
- Founded: 1953
- Founder: Pat Higgins
- Headquarters: Granard, County Longford, Ireland
- Products: Baked goods
- Number of employees: 400 (2007)
- Website: http://patthebaker.com/

Pat the Baker is an Irish bread-making company founded in 1953 by Pat Higgins. After acquiring the previously rival "Irish Pride" brand in 2015, the company became the second-largest bakery in Ireland. As of 2007, the company reportedly had over 400 employees. Its main competitors include Brennans Bread and Johnston Mooney and O'Brien.

== History ==
Pat the Baker was founded in 1953 by Pat Higgins, a Mayo native who married a woman from Granard in County Longford and settled in the town. In 1977, the company expanded its business from a local bakery with a view to becoming a "nationwide brand". Pat the Baker opened its first depot in Dublin in 1984, and by 1992 was providing 80% of the own brand bread sold in Quinnsworth. A "high profile trade union recognition case" in the mid-1990s, involving the company, was one of several cases cited in debates on the proposed introduction of union recognition legislation in Ireland.

By the time of the death in 2007 of its founder, Pat Higgins, the company employed over 400 people. Following Higgins's death, the company remained within the control of the Higgins family. One of Higgins' sons, also named Pat Higgins, subsequently adopted the title "Pat the Baker".

In 2015, Pat the Baker bought Irish Pride, a rival bakery which was then in receivership, for €4.5 million. The sale, which was approved by the Competition Authority, followed a report that Irish Pride "could have been saved". After the acquisition, the combined company became the country's second-largest bakery firm. At the time of the sale, Pat the Baker had distribution centres in Dublin, Cork, Limerick, Kilkenny, Letterkenny, Castleisland, Galway, and Armagh.

A television advert (which ran from 1980 to 2002) contributed to the "popularity of the brand throughout Ireland", and it was one of the "top 20" retail brands in the country as of June 2021. The company has sponsored a marathon in Longford, and began sponsoring The Graham Norton Show on Virgin Media Television in 2021.

In June 2022, the Workplace Relations Commission upheld an unfair dismissal claim by a former employee of the company.

In January 2025, it was announced that the business was to be acquired by the London-based equity firm, Mayfair Equity Partners.

== Products ==
The company produces sliced pans, speciality bread, scones, white bread, brown bread and catering bread. Its products have received the Master Bakers Association Award eight times. During 2022, some of the company's products were subject to a precautionary recall by the Food Safety Authority of Ireland.
