= Nicola Faganello =

Italian ambassador to Ireland since 2024

His Excellency Nicola Faganello
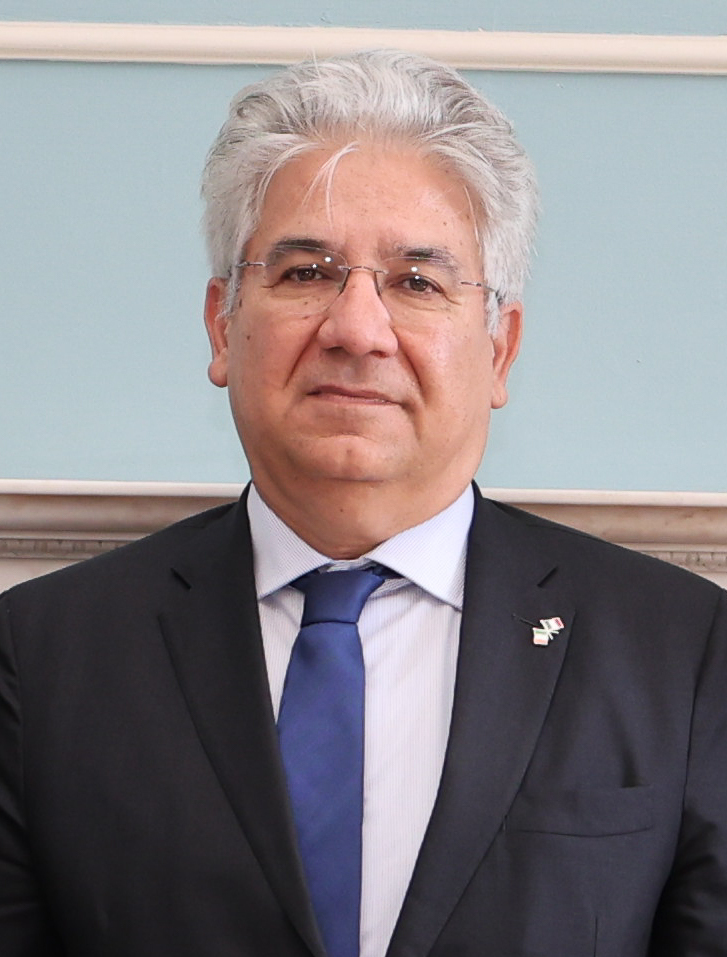

Italy Ambassador to Ireland
- Incumbent
- Assumed office 17 December 2024
- President: Sergio Mattarella

Personal details
- Born: 2 July 1967 (age 58) Portogruaro, Italy
- Education: Law degree
- Alma mater: University of Trento

Nicola Faganello (born 2 July 1967) is the ambassador of Italy to Ireland. He presented his credentials to the Irish president, Michael D. Higgins, on 17 December 2024.

Nicola Faganello was born on 2 July 1967 in Portogruaro, Italy. He has a law degree from the University of Trento and has been a career diplomat with the Italian ministry of foreign affairs since 1993.

From 1995 to 1999, he was second secretary at the embassy of Italy in Athens. From 1999 to 2003, he was first secretary at the Italian embassy in Jakarta.

Between 2003 and 2007, he worked at the Italian ministry of foreign affairs. From 2007 to 2011, he was consul general of Italy in Los Angeles. Between 2011 and 2015, he was a representative to the World Trade Organization in Geneva.

Prior to his appointment as ambassador to Ireland in 2024, Faganello worked in various roles at the Italian ministry of foreign affairs and international cooperation from 2015 to 2024.

He is an Official Knight of the Order of Merit of the Italian Republic.
