= Michael O'Regan (journalist) =

Irish journalist (1953–2024)

- Born: 3 November 1953; Annagh, County Kerry, Ireland
- Died: 18 February 2024 (aged 70); Dublin, Ireland
- Occupation: Political journalist
- Spouse: Elizabeth Henry (m. 1984)
- Children: 2

Michael O'Regan (3 November 1953 – 18 February 2024) was an Irish journalist, political analyst and broadcaster. He came into prominence after his coverage of the Kerry babies tribunal. O'Regan then specialised in Irish politics, where his reporting on Leinster House and expertise on the subject became what he was best known for. He worked for prominent Irish newspapers, most notably reporting for The Irish Times from 1981 to 2019, and appeared as an expert on domestic radio and TV.

== Early life ==
Born on 3 November 1954 in Annagh, County Kerry, O'Regan was the third of five children of Patrick and Mary O'Regan. His father was a baker while his mother looked after their small farm. Following his second-level schooling, O'Regan won a scholarship to Rathmines College of Commerce and qualified from the first national course in journalism in 1972.

== Career ==
After college, O'Regan got a job as a junior reporter with The Kerryman and The Corkman newspapers. He won the Benson & Hedges National Award for Outstanding Work in Provincial Journalism in 1980, which resulted in him joining The Irish Times as a general reporter a year later. O'Regan covered the Kerry babies tribunal in 1985, before being appointed Dáil reporter in 1988. He was a cornerstone of the newspaper's political coverage for more than 30 years.

It was this appointment that began his career as a successful political editor as opposed to a general reporter, and he continued to work from Leinster House until his retirement. He particularly enjoyed analysing potential electoral outcomes and the motives of decisions of politicians such as Charles Haughey, Dick Spring, and Albert Reynolds.

He made regular appearances on current affairs shows on RTÉ, Newstalk, and TV3, while he had a weekly Call from the Dáil slot on Radio Kerry. O'Regan retired from his Leinster House reporting in 2019.

== Personal life ==
O'Regan's brother, Gerard, was also involved in journalism as editor of three national newspapers, while his younger sister Eilish was the Irish Independent health correspondent. He married Elizabeth Henry, a nurse from Sligo, in 1984. His daughters, Deirdre and Alyson, continued the family tradition of journalism, taking up jobs with The Washington Post and the BBC. His daughter Deirdre gave birth to a daughter in July 2019.

O'Regan was diagnosed with a tumour in his leg in July 2018 and this was followed by kidney failure and multiple myeloma, a blood cancer. He died suddenly on 18 February 2024 at the age of 70.
