= Brennans Bread =

Irish bakery company

- Company logo
- Company type: Privately held company
- Industry: Baking
- Founded: 1972
- Founder: Joseph Brennan
- Headquarters: Walkinstown, Dublin, Ireland
- Products: Baked goods
- Website: https://brennansbread.ie/

Brennans Bread is an Irish bread-making company founded in 1972 by Joseph A. Brennan. It is one of the largest bakeries in Ireland. Its main competitors include Johnston Mooney and O'Brien and Pat the Baker.

== History ==
Joseph A. Brennan began baking loaves of white bread in 1972, in a single room bakery on Fumbally Lane in The Liberties, Dublin. Initially, the business served the Dublin area, before expanding nationwide and internationally. When the business outgrew its Fumbally Lane premises, it moved to its current location in the Greenhills Industrial Estate in Walkinstown, Dublin.

Joseph A. Brennan, died on 26 May 2024. The business continues to be owned and operated by his two sons.

== Marketing ==
The business's slogan is "Today's Bread Today", referencing the fact that its bread is baked fresh every day.

The business's radio and television advertisements typically feature a narrator, speaking in a strong Dublin accent, recounting conversations he has had with "Old Mr. Brennan", referencing the business's founder and face of the company, Joseph Brennan.

The business markets itself as a "national treasure" by associating its bread with Irish culture and as a product missed by Irish emigrants, and in 2023 collaborated with an Irish brewery Wicklow Wolf to produce a Brennans Bread beer. Brennans Bread consistently features in the top five of surveys of Ireland's most-loved brands.
