= Chris Murphy (Gaelic footballer) =

Northern Irish Gaelic footballer (1968–2024)

Personal information
- Native name: Criostóir Ó Murchú (Irish)
- Nickname: Big Bird
- Born: 1968 Castlewellan, County Down, Northern Ireland
- Died: 15 December 2024 (aged 56) Belfast, Northern Ireland

Sport
- Sport: Gaelic football
- Position: Midfield
Clubs
- Years: Club
- Castlewellan; St Paul's; Clan na Gael
Club titles
- Antrim titles: 3
Inter-county
- Years: County
- Antrim
Inter-county titles
- Ulster titles: 0
- All-Irelands: 0
- NFL: 0
- All Stars: 0

Christopher Murphy (1968 – 15 December 2024) was a Northern Irish Gaelic football coach and player. At club level he played with Castlewellan, St Paul's and Clan na Gael and was also a member of the Antrim senior football team.

Murphy's club career began with Castlewellan in Down before later moving to St Paul's in Belfast. He won three Antrim SFC medals with the latter club in a four-year period. At inter-county level, Murphy was part of the Antrim team that won the Ulster U21FC title in 1989. He later lined out with the senior team. Murphy's club career also brought him to Clan na Gael in Lurgan, where he was named Player of the Year in 2003. He returned to St Paul's as a coach at underage levels.

Murphy died on 15 December 2024, at the age of 56.

== Honours ==
St Paul's

- Antrim Senior Football Championship: 1994, 1996, 1997

Derry

- Ulster Under-21 Football Championship: 1989
