= Ralph Prendergast =

Irish hurler

Personal information
- Native name: Ráulbh de Priondragás (Irish)
- Born: 1936 Limerick, Ireland
- Died: 28 June 2024 (aged 87) Limerick, Ireland
- Height: 5 ft 8 in (173 cm)

Sport
- Sport: Hurling
- Position: Left wing-forward
Clubs
- Years: Club
- Claughaun; Limerick GAA Club, New York
Club titles
	Football	Hurling
Limerick titles	2	1
Inter-county
- Years: County
- 1955–1957; 1965 1958–1959: Limerick; New York
Inter-county titles
- Munster titles: 1
- All-Irelands: 0
- NHL: 0

Ralph Prendergast (1936 – 28 June 2024) was an Irish hurler, Gaelic footballer and footballer. At club level he played with Claughaun and at inter-county level with Limerick and New York. Prendergast also played with Cork Hibernians in the League of Ireland.

== Career ==
Prendergast attended Limerick CBS, and was part of the school's senior team beaten by the North Monastery in the Harty Cup in 1955. His performances earned his inclusion on the Munster colleges team he won an All-Ireland medal after a defeat of Leinster.

At club level with Claughaun, Prendergast began his career by winning a Limerick MHC title in 1954. He progressed to adult level as a dual player and won a Limerick SFC medal in 1955. Prendergast also made his first appearance with the Limerick senior hurling team, having previously played at minor level. He was part of a Mick Mackey-trained team that won the Munster SHC title in 1955.

Prendergast emigrated to the United States in 1957 but continued his Gaelic games activities. He joined the Limerick club and won a New York SHC medal in 1961. He also lined out with the New York senior team. After returning to Ireland Prendergast resumed his Limerick career in the National Hurling League, before being banned from the GAA after lining out with Cork Hibernians in the League of Ireland. He was later reinstated and ended his club career by winning a Limerick SHC-SFC double with Claughaun in 1971.

== Death ==
Prendergast died on 28 June 2024, at the age of 87.

== Honours ==
Claughaun

- Limerick Senior Football Championship: 1955, 1971
- Limerick Senior Hurling Championship: 1971
- Limerick Minor Hurling Championship: 1954

Limerick GAA Club, New York

- New York Senior Hurling Championship: 1961

Limerick

- Munster Senior Hurling Championship: 1955

Munster

- All-Ireland Colleges Interprovincial Hurling Championship: 1955
