= Hughie Travers =

Irish Gaelic footballer (1943–2024)

Personal information
- Nickname: Big Hughie
- Born: 1943 Donegal, Ireland
- Died: 9 July 2024 (aged 81) Letterkenny, Ireland

Sport
- Sport: Gaelic football
- Position: Centre-forward
Club
- Years: Club
- Four Masters
Club titles
- Donegal titles: 0
Inter-county
- Years: County
- 1962-1966: Donegal
Inter-county titles
- Ulster titles: 0
- All-Irelands: 0
- NFL: 0

Hugh J. Travers (1943 – 9 July 2024) was an Irish Gaelic footballer. At club level he played with Four Masters and at inter-county level with the Donegal senior football team.

== Career ==
Travers first played for Donegal during a three-year tenure with the minor team between 1959 and 1961. He immediately progressed to the under-21 team and won consecutive Ulster U21FC medals in 1963 and 1964 after respective defeats of Cavan and Monaghan. By that stage Travers had already joined the senior team, having also lined out with the junior team. He won a combined total of four McKenna Cup and Dr Lagan Cup medals between 1963 and 1966. Travers also lined out in Donegal's 1965 NFL semi-final defeat by Kerry.

== Death ==
Travers died in Letterkenny on 9 July 2024, at the age of 81.

== Honours ==
Donegal

- McKenna Cup: 1963, 1965
- Dr Lagan Cup: 1965, 1966
- Ulster Under-21 Football Championship: 1963, 1964
