= 1923 All-Ireland Junior Hurling Championship =

All Ireland Champions
- Winners: Offaly (1st win)
- Captain: J. Halligan

All Ireland Runners-up
- Runners-up: Cork
- Captain: M. Murphy

Provincial Champions
- Munster: Cork
- Leinster: Offaly
- Ulster: Not Played
- Connacht: Not Played

The 1923 All-Ireland Junior Hurling Championship was the sixth staging of the All-Ireland Junior Championship since its establishment by the Gaelic Athletic Association in 1912. It was the first championship to be completed in the aftermath of the Irish revolutionary period.

Cork entered the championship as the defending champions.

The All-Ireland final was played on 12 October 1924 at Croke Park in Dublin, between Offaly and Cork in what was their first ever championship meeting. Offaly won the match by 3-04 to 3-02 to claim their first ever championship title.

== Results ==
=== All-Ireland Junior Hurling Championship ===
==== All-Ireland semi-final ====
22 June 1924 Semi-final	Offaly	7-04 - 0-01	Galway	Athlone Sportsfield

==== All-Ireland final ====
12 October 1924 Final	Offaly	3-04 - 3-02	Cork	Croke Park
