= Joe Gaston (rugby union) =

Rugby union player from Northern Ireland

- Full name: Joseph Tate Gaston
- Born: 28 November 1930 Cloughmills, County Antrim, Northern Ireland
- Died: 19 October 2024 (aged 93) Coleraine, County Londonderry, Northern Ireland
- School: Ballymena Academy
- University: Trinity College Dublin
- Occupation: Medical doctor

Rugby union career
- Position: Wing
International career
Years	Team	Apps	(Points)
1954–56	Ireland	8	(3)

Joseph Tate Gaston (28 November 1930 – 19 October 2024) was an Irish international rugby union player.

== Biography ==
Born in Cloughmills, near Ballymena, Gaston was educated at Ballymena Academy and Trinity College Dublin.

Gaston, who captained Dublin University, was a speedy wing three-quarter. He represented Ulster and was capped eight times for Ireland during the 1950s, debuting against the touring 1954–55 All Blacks at Lansdowne Road.

A doctor, Gaston played for Northampton while posted to Northampton General Hospital.

Gaston raised three sons and two daughters with wife Maureen, a former Moyle District Councillor. His wife and daughter Kathryn were both killed in a car accident in Moss-side in 1982.

Gaston died in Coleraine, County Londonderry on 19 October 2024, at the age of 93.

== See also ==
- List of Ireland national rugby union players
