= Anne Ebbs =

Irish Paralympian in table tennis (1940–2024)

Personal information
- Born: 1940
- Died: 24 February 2024 (aged 83–84)

Sport
- Sport: Table tennis
Medal record
Women's table tennis
Representing Ireland
Paralympic Games
Silver medal – second place	1972 Heidelberg	Teams 2
Silver medal – second place	1984 New York/Stoke Mandeville	Teams 2
Bronze medal – third place	1980 Arnhem	Teams 2

Anne Ebbs (née Sinnott; 1940 – 24 February 2024) was an Irish Paralympic table tennis medallist. Outside of her table tennis career, Ebbs founded the Paralympic Council of Ireland in 1987 and was the organization's secretary general until 2008. Ebbs was awarded the Paralympic Order in 2010.

== Early life and education ==
When Ebbs was one year old, she was diagnosed with poliomyelitis. She began her education in Donore, County Meath and completed a course at a Dún Laoghaire rehabilitation hospital in 1962.

== Career ==
After completing her education, Ebbs started her career as a telephone clerk in 1963 and joined the Irish Wheelchair Association in the 1960s as a Sports Committee member. In the 1970s, Ebbs worked as a fundraising administrator and a driving school for the IWA. In 1986, she became an administrator in sports and later became the IWA's Sports Director.

The following year, Ebbs created the Paralympic Council of Ireland in 1987. For the Paralympic Council of Ireland, she was the secretary general from 1987 to 2008. Ebbs was also selected onto the board of the Irish Institute of Sport in 2007 and was elected to Paralympics Ireland's board of directors as a lifelong honorable member in 2013. Alternatively, Ebbs was Ireland's head of mission at the 1988 Summer Paralympics and assistant head of mission at the 1996 Summer Paralympics.

Outside of her work in sports development, Ebbs participated in multiple Paralympic Games for Ireland from 1972 to 1984. During her Paralympic career, she won a silver medal for table tennis in 1972 and 1984 and bronze in 1980. Apart from the Paralympics, Ebbs was named a member of the 2012 Summer Olympics assembling team in 2006.

== Personal life and death ==
Ebbs was married to table tennis player Tony Ebbs in 1982 and remained married until his death in 1984. Anne Ebbs died in February 2024.

== Awards and honours ==
In 2008, Ebbs was honoured with the Paralympic Order and received the Irish Paralympic Order in 2012. The same year, Ebbs was a torchbearer for the 2012 Summer Olympics. Ebbs has also been awarded the Trailblazers Award by Women's Executive Network in 2013 and honoured by Paralympics Ireland at the More Than Sports event in 2016.
