= Murders of Lisa Cash, Christy Cawley, and Chelsea Cawley =

2022 murders in Dublin, Ireland

Murders of Lisa Cash, Christy Cawley and Chelsea Cawley
- Date: 4 September 2022
- Location: Tallaght, Dublin, Ireland
- Deaths: 3
- Injuries: 1
- Accused: Andy Cash
- Convictions: Murder (3 counts)
- Sentence: 3 life sentences

Siblings, Lisa Cash, Christy Cawley and Chelsea Cawley, aged 18 and 8 respectively, from Tallaght, South County Dublin were killed in their home, in the early hours of 4 September 2022. Their 14-year-old brother raised the alarm by jumping out of the window. A 24-year-old man, Andy Cash, was arrested at the scene, and was charged with the murders the following day.

== Victims ==
The three siblings grew up in Tallaght, Dublin. Eight-year-old twins Christy and Chelsea Cawley attended St Aidan's Senior National School and had recently made their First Holy Communion. 18-year-old Lisa Cash attended St Aidan's Community School and sat her Leaving Certificate in 2021.

== Attack ==
Gardaí were called to the property on the Rossfield Estate in Tallaght at about 12:30 am on Sunday 4 September 2022, describing the incident as "violent, challenging and traumatic." The three siblings were stabbed a number of times by a man known to them who used a large bladed object and were taken by ambulance to Children's Health Ireland at Crumlin, but all three were later pronounced dead. Their 14-year-old brother, who managed to flee the property to notify neighbours, was also hospitalised with non-life-threatening injuries. Gardaí believed the twins were thrown from an upstairs window during the attack.

== Investigation ==
A suspect known to the victims, a man in his early 20s, was arrested at the scene after being subdued by members of the Garda Armed Support Unit (ASU) and Garda Emergency Response Unit (ERU) using non-lethal weapons, including a taser and pepper spray.

A full forensic examination of the scene was carried out. The upstairs and downstairs windows of the property were open and smashed while blood stains could be seen on the window frames.

The suspect was treated for injuries while in custody, which delayed questioning. He had previously been investigated in relation to an assault against a member of the children's family but was not convicted of the crime. He had also previously made threats against the family and had been linked to number of alcohol-fuelled incidents including criminal damage. He was also known to local Gardaí for offences including theft and burglary, but had no major previous convictions.

The next day, on 5 September, 24-year-old Andy Cash was charged with the three counts of murder of his three siblings. That evening, he was brought before a special late sitting of Dublin District Court.

== Sentencing ==
26-year-old Andy Cash pleaded guilty to the murders of his two sisters and brother – Lisa Cash, Christy and Chelsea Cawley – on 7 May 2024 at the Central Criminal Court. He received three terms of life imprisonment, the mandatory sentence. The court heard Cash subjected his victims to hundreds of stab and slash wounds before throwing the body of his eight-year-old brother out of the first floor window of their home. All three victims had suffered "catastrophic" injuries having been stabbed multiple times, the detective said. All three victims had suffered "catastrophic" injuries, particularly their faces, necks and torsos. Lisa had 71 injuries, Christy had 107 and Chelsea had 65.

== Reactions ==
Garda Commissioner Drew Harris described the incident as "dreadful and traumatic". Minister for Justice Helen McEntee described the killings as a "tragedy, so awful and heart-breaking." Taoiseach Micheál Martin said he was shocked and appalled as was the entire country at the deaths.

On his morning radio programme on Monday 5 September, Irish broadcaster Ryan Tubridy broke down as he tried to discuss the incident. Principal of St. Aidan's Community School in Brookfield, Kevin Shortall, said that the community was struggling to comprehend the tragedy.

A large crowd gathered for a vigil which was held the day after the killings outside the house to mourn the three siblings. Balloons were released and candles were lit in memory of the trio, as songs were played to the crowd.
