= Jilan Wahba Abdalmajid =

Palestinian diplomat

HE Ambassador Dr Jilan Wahba Abdalmajid
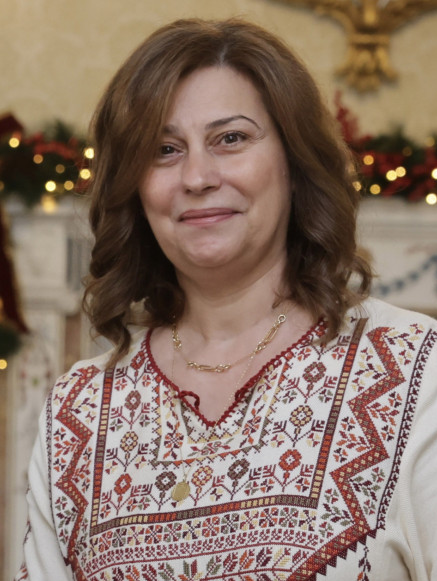
- Wahba Abdalmajid in 2024

Palestinian Ambassador to Ireland
- Incumbent
- Assumed office November 2024
- Preceded by: Office established

Head of mission of the Palestinian Authority in Ireland
- In office 2020 – November 2024
- Preceded by: Ahmed Abdel Razek

Personal details
- Born: Gaza Strip
- Spouse: Rami Abdalmajid
- Children: 3
- Education: University of Nicosia

Jilan Wahba Abdalmajid is a Palestinian diplomat who has been the Palestinian ambassador to Ireland since November 2024, following the formal establishment of diplomatic relations between Ireland and the State of Palestine on 29 September 2024. She had previously been the head of mission of the Palestinian Authority in Ireland since 2020. The elevation to full ambassador followed Ireland's recognition of the State of Palestine in May 2024.

== Education ==
Wahba Abdalmajid completed a PhD at the University of Nicosia (UNIC).

== Career ==
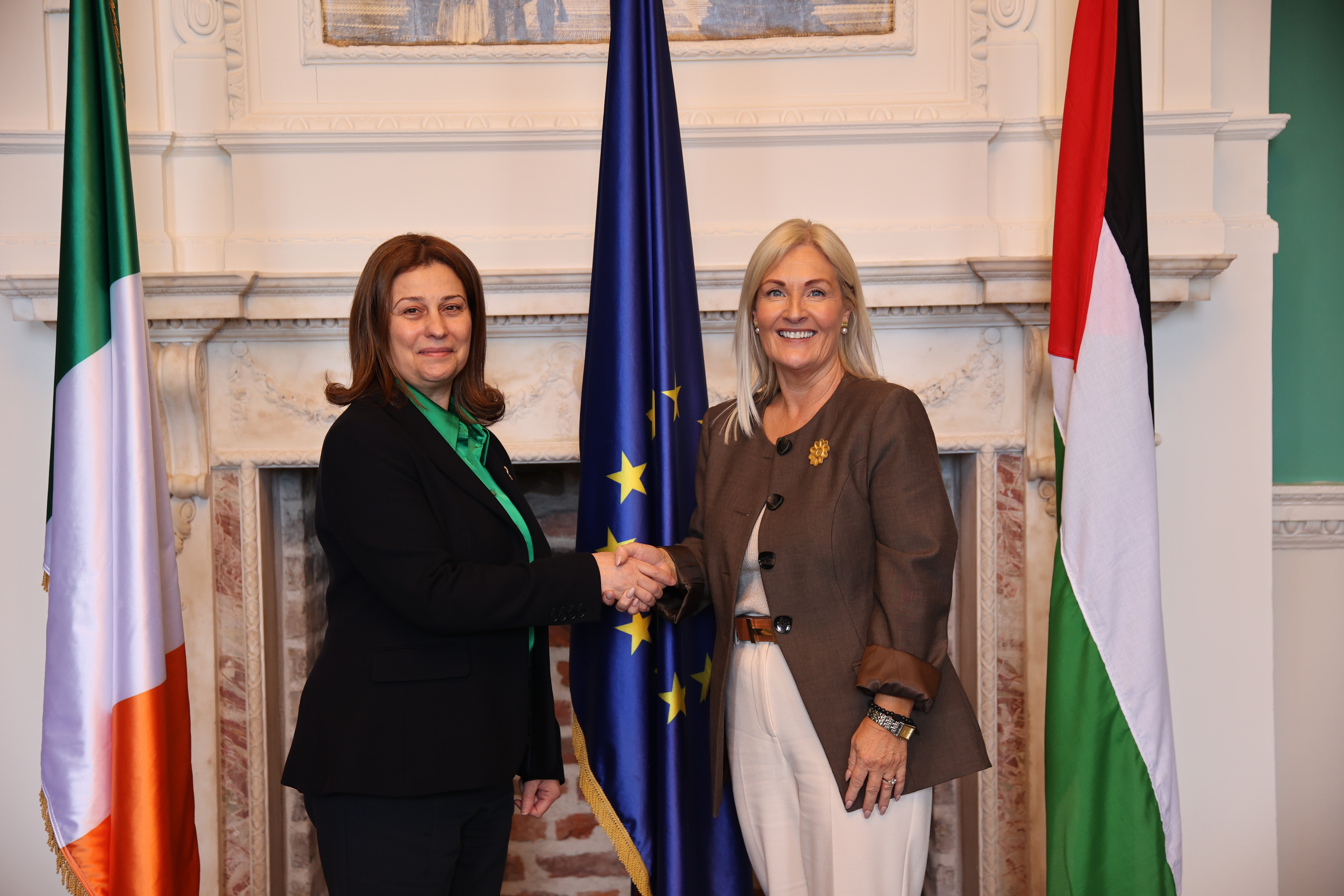
Wahba Abdalmajid with Verona Murphy in March 2025

Wahba Abdalmajid began her diplomatic service at the Palestinian Ministry of Foreign Affairs in 1995 as assistant chief of protocol. She was then posted in Cyprus and came to Ireland in 2014 as deputy to the former head of mission, Ahmad Abdelrazek. She presented her credentials as head of mission of the Palestinian Authority in Ireland to President Michael D. Higgins in January 2020. In 2021 she was awarded the Diplomatic Service Medal by Diplomacy in Ireland – The European Diplomat in recognition of excellence in the use of social media in support of diplomatic efforts. Wahba Abdalmajid has been considered one of the most prominent female Palestinian voices.

== Personal life ==
She is married to Rami Abdalmajid and is a mother of three children.

== Political positions ==
In December 2021, Jilan Wahba Abdalmajid warned in an interview with the Belgian newspaper De Morgen that the situation in the Gaza Strip would explode if the blockade continued.

== See also ==
- Foreign relations of Ireland
- Foreign relations of Palestine
- Ireland–Palestine relations
