= Kevin Kelly (Gaelic footballer) =

Irish Gaelic footballer (1945–2024)

Personal information
- Native name: Caoimhín Ó Ceallaigh (Irish)
- Born: 1945 Carbury, County Kildare, Ireland
- Died: 17 December 2024 (aged 79) Athlone; County Westmeath, Ireland
- Occupation: Garda Síochána
- Height: 5 ft 8 in (173 cm)

Sport
- Sport: Gaelic football
- Position: Left wing-forward
Clubs
- Years: Club
- Carbury; Athlone
Club titles
- Kildare titles: 6
Inter-county
- Years: County
- Kildare
Inter-county titles
- Leinster titles: 0
- All-Irelands: 0
- NFL: 0
- All Stars: 0

Kevin Kelly (1945 – 17 December 2024) was an Irish Gaelic footballer. At club level he played with Carbury and Athlone and was also a member of the Kildare senior football team.

Kelly's club career spanned two different clubs and two different counties. He won six Kildare SFC medals with Carbury, while he also won three Westmeath SFC medals with Athlone. At inter-county level, Kelly won an All-Ireland U21FC medal with Kildare in 1965, before later lining out for the senior team.

Kelly died on 17 December 2024, at the age of 79.

== Honours ==
Carbury

- Kildare Senior Football Championship: 1965, 1966, 1969, 1971, 1972, 1974

Athlone

- Westmeath Senior Football Championship: 1977, 1979, 1982

Kildare

- All-Ireland Under-21 Football Championship: 1965
- Leinster Under-21 Football Championship: 1965
