= Steve Duggan (Gaelic footballer) =

Irish Gaelic footballer (1947–2024

Personal information
- Native name: Stiofán Ó Duagáin (Irish)
- Nickname: Stevie
- Born: 26 December 1947 Ballyhaise, County Cavan, Ireland
- Died: 4 April 2024 (aged 76) Miami, Florida, United States
- Occupations: Businessman, publican

Sport
- Sport: Gaelic football
- Position: Full-forward
Club
- Years: Club
- Ballyhaise
Club titles
- Cavan titles: 0
Inter-county
- Years: County
- 1966–1979: Cavan
Inter-county titles
- Ulster titles: 2
- All-Irelands: 0
- NFL: 0
- All Stars: 0

Stephen Duggan (26 December 1947 – 4 April 2024) was an Irish Gaelic footballer. He played at club level with Ballyhaise and at inter-county level with the Cavan senior football team.

== Career ==
Duggan first played Gaelic football at juvenile and underage level with the Ballyhaise club. He eventually progressed to adult level and was part of the team that won the Cavan IFC title after a defeat of Crosserlough in 1968.

At inter-county level, Duggan first appeared for Cavan as part of the minor team that lost back-to-back Ulster MFC deciders in 1964 and 1965. He immediately progressed to the under-21 team, while he also lined out with the junior team. Duggan made his senior team debut in 1966 and won Ulster SFC medals in 1967 and 1969.

Duggan continued to line out with Cavan until 1979. His performances also earned selection to the Ulster inter-provincial team and he won Railway Cup medals in 1970 and 1971.

== Personal life ==
Duggan was in a relationship with Tina Moore, the ex-wife of 1966 FIFA World Cup-winning captain Bobby Moore.

== Death ==
Duggan died in Miami, Florida on 4 April 2024, at the age of 76.

== Honours ==
Ballyhaise

- Cavan Intermediate Football Championship: 1968

Cavan

- Ulster Senior Football Championship: 1967, 1969
- Dr McKenna Cup: 1968

Ulster

- Railway Cup: 1970, 1971
