= Mattie McAuliffe =

Irish hurler (1929–2024)

Personal information
- Native name: Maitiú Mac Amhlaoibh (Irish)
- Born: 1929 Tralee, County Kerry, Ireland
- Died: 24 January 2024 (aged 94) Macroom; County Cork, Ireland

Sport
- Sport: Hurling
- Position: Centre-forward
Clubs
- Years: Club
- Castlemagner → Duhallow; Macroom; Millstreet
Club titles
	Football	Hurling
Cork titles	0	0
Inter-county
Years	County	Apps (scores)
1955	Cork	1 (0-00)
Inter-county titles
- Munster titles: 0
- All-Irelands: 0
- NHL: 0

Matthew J. McAuliffe (1929 – 24 January 2024) was an Irish hurler and Gaelic footballer. At club level he played with Castlemagner, Macroom and Millstreet, divisional side Duhallow and also at inter-county level with the Cork senior hurling team.

== Career ==
McAuliffe first played hurling and Gaelic football with Castlemagner during a golden age of success for the club. He won four successive Duhallow divisional titles across both codes from 1951 to 1954, as well as claiming a Cork JFC medal in 1952 and Cork JHC honours in 1954.

Club success resulted in McAuliffe being selected for the Cork junior hurling team in 1955. He lined out at centre-forward in the first round defeat of Tipperary, a performances which resulted in an immediate call-up to the senior team. McAuliffe made his only appearance in a 3–08 to 2-10 Munster SHC quarter-final defeat by Clare.

McAuliffe transferred to the Macroom club around this time and lined out when they were beaten by Lees in the 1955 Cork SFC final. He subsequently transferred to the Millstreet club and won further Duhallow divisional honours in 1962 and 1963. McAuliffe was at full-back when Millstreet beat St Nicholas' to win his second Cork JFC medal in 1963.

== Death ==
McAuliffe died on 26 January 2023, at the age of 94.

== Honours ==
Castlemagner

- Cork Junior Football Championship: 1952
- Cork Junior Hurling Championship: 1954
- Duhallow Junior Football Championship: 1952
- Duhallow Junior Hurling Championship: 1951, 1953, 1954

Millstreet

- Cork Junior Football Championship: 1963
- Duhallow Junior Football Championship: 1963
- Duhallow Junior Hurling Championship: 1962, 1963
