= 1927 All-Ireland Junior Hurling Championship =

All Ireland Champions
- Winners: Meath (1st win)
- Captain: L. Mitchell

All Ireland Runners-up
- Runners-up: Britain
- Captain: J. Ryan

Provincial Champions
- Munster: Limerick
- Leinster: Meath
- Ulster: Not Played
- Connacht: Not Played

The 1927 All-Ireland Junior Hurling Championship was the 10th staging of the All-Ireland Junior Championship since its establishment by the Gaelic Athletic Association in 1912.

Tipperary entered the championship as the defending champions, however, they were beaten by Limerick in the Munster first round.

The All-Ireland final was played on 1 July 1928 at Dundalk Sportsfield, between Meath and Britain, in what was their first ever meeting in a final. Meath won the match by 2-03 to 1-01 to claim their first ever championship title.

== Results ==
=== All-Ireland Junior Hurling Championship ===
==== All-Ireland semi-finals ====
30 October 1927 Semi-final	Galway	4-07 - 1-02	Antrim	Croke Park

30 October 1927 Semi-final	Meath	5-02 - 3-00	Limerick	Thurles Sportsfield

==== All-Ireland home final ====
1 April 1928 Home final	Meath	5-04 - 3-02	Galway	Croke Park

==== All-Ireland final ====
1 July 1928 Final	Meath	2-03 - 1-01	Britain	Dundalk Sportsfield
