= 1928 All-Ireland Junior Hurling Championship =

All Ireland Champions
- Winners: Kilkenny (1st win)
- Captain: Tom Mullins

All Ireland Runners-up
- Runners-up: Tipperary
- Captain: Arthur Foley

Provincial Champions
- Munster: Tipperary
- Leinster: Kilkenny
- Ulster: Not Played
- Connacht: Not Played

The 1928 All-Ireland Junior Hurling Championship was the 11th staging of the All-Ireland Junior Championship since its establishment by the Gaelic Athletic Association in 1912.

Meath entered the championship as the defending champions, however, they were beaten in the Leinster Championship.

The All-Ireland final was played on 5 May 1929 at Waterford Sportsfield, between Kilkenny and Tipperary, in what was their first meeting in a final since 1913. Kilkenny won the match by 4-06 to 4-04 to claim their first ever championship title.

== Results ==
=== All-Ireland Junior Hurling Championship ===
==== All-Ireland semi-finals ====
2 December 1928 Semi-final	Antrim	2-03 - 5-01	Tipperary	Corrigan Park

7 April 1929 Semi-final	Kilkenny	5-04 - 0-01	Galway	St. Brendan's Park

==== All-Ireland final ====
5 May 1929 Final	Kilkenny	4-06 - 4-04	Tipperary	Waterford Sportsfield
