= 2014 in Ireland =

- Centuries: 19th; 20th; 21st
- Decades: 1990s; 2000s; 2010s; 2020s
- See also: 2014 in Northern Ireland; Other events of 2014; List of years in Ireland

This is a list of events that occurred during the year 2014 in Ireland.

== Incumbents ==
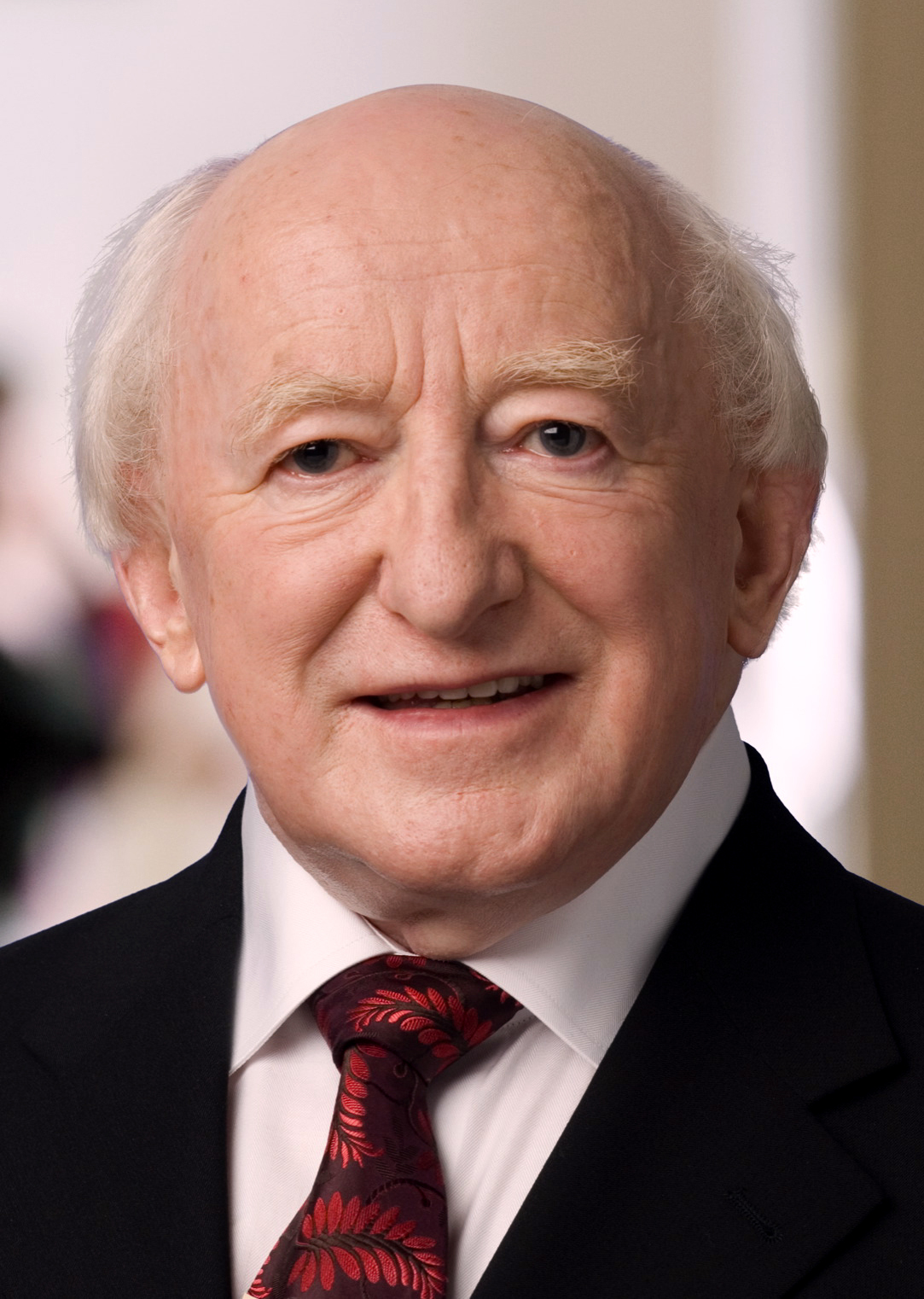
President Michael D. Higgins

- President: Michael D. Higgins
- Taoiseach: Enda Kenny (FG)
- Tánaiste:
  - Eamon Gilmore (Lab) (until 4 July 2014)
  - Joan Burton (Lab) (from 4 July 2014)
- Minister for Finance: Michael Noonan (FG)
- Chief Justice: Susan Denham
- Dáil: 31st
- Seanad: 24th

== Events ==
=== January ===
- 1 January
  - New Year's Day (public holiday).
  - The Protection of Life During Pregnancy Act 2013 came into effect, defining when abortions may be performed.
  - The age of eligibility to receive the State pension rose to 66 years.
  - The exceptionally stormy season begun in December continued with violent gales, heavy rain, high tides, and heavy flooding all over the country, with power supplies cut off to as many as 5,000 customers.
- 2 January – The Chief of Staff of the Defence Forces, Lieutenant General Conor O'Boyle, apologised to the President and Commander-in-Chief, Michael D. Higgins, following a call-in radio programme which discussed a Christmas Eve homily by the Army's head chaplain, Monsignor Eoin Thynne, who noted the absence of Christian remarks in the President's Christmas message, broadcast on 22 December.

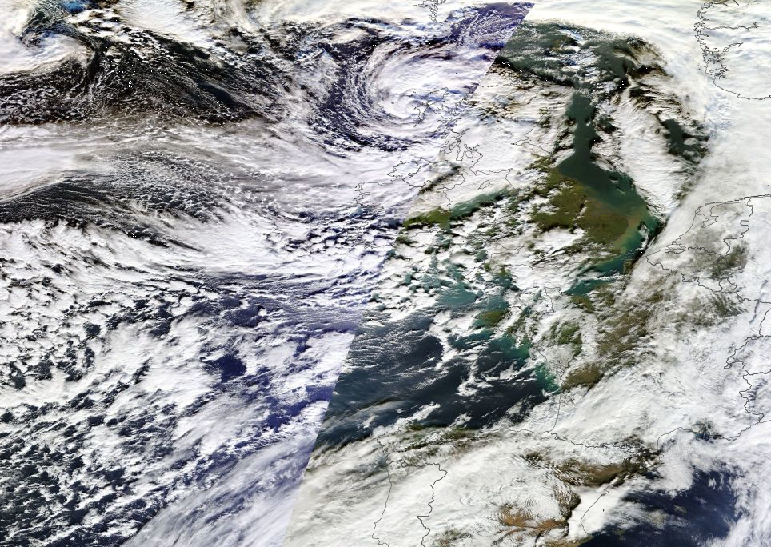
Cyclone Anne on 3 January 2014

- 3 January – During storm Anne The River Liffey in Dublin rose to its highest tide on record. It burst its banks near the Guinness Storehouse and Heuston Station. Some city quays were closed for an hour while pumping was performed. The East Link Bridge and Strand Road in Sandymount were also closed.
- 4 January – A very large Irish trade and diplomatic mission travelled to the Persian Gulf region. Over 80 firms sending 100 people on a five-day Enterprise Ireland mission to Saudi Arabia, Qatar, Dubai and Abu Dhabi were led by the Taoiseach, Enda Kenny, accompanied by the Minister for Enterprise, Jobs and Innovation, Richard Bruton.
- 6 January – Nollaig na mBan was celebrated on the last day of Christmas.
- 6–7 January – The most prolonged and destructive Irish storm in almost two decades, Superstorm Christine, struck Ireland and did considerable damage, particularly in western and southern coastal parts of the country, on the 175th anniversary of the Night of the Big Wind. The initial assessment of the value of destruction was up to €300m.
- 24 January – Mount Carmel Hospital in Dublin applied suddenly to the High Court to go into liquidation when National Asset Management Agency financial support was withdrawn. Over 300 jobs were to be lost as a result.
- 25–29 January – A large fire broke out after 3 am on 25 January in the recycling plant at the Merrywell Industrial Estate in Ballymount, Dublin. Fifteen units of the Dublin Fire Brigade and 75 firefighters responded. The blaze was visible in Blessington, 23 kilometres away. Smoke reduced visibility and affected traffic, while residents of surrounding suburbs were advised to shut their doors and windows because of poisons released into the air. The occurrence of a second fire at the same time in a nearby carpet centre raised the question of arson being the cause. The fire was finally extinguished after five days. Three investigations were conducted by the Environmental Protection Agency, by the Gardaí, and by the Fire Service.
- 30 January – An Coimisiún le Rincí Gaelacha, the Irish Dancing Commission, announced a ban effective from 1 March on the use of make-up, false eyelashes, and fake tan on the faces of Irish dancers aged under 10. Artificial carriage aids used to enforce a rigid posture were also banned for safety reasons. Wigs and the use of fake tan on legs were not prohibited.
- 31 January–1 February – Storm Brigid blew winds reaching 120 km/h and caused flooding along the west coast including in Tralee, Limerick, and Galway. Power supplies to thousands of homes were severed, flights from Dublin Airport were cancelled, as were ferry sailings from Rosslare.

=== February ===
- 1 February – A man in Ringsend was found dead after responding to a neck nomination drinking dare.
- 11 February – Billionaire American property developer Donald Trump bought the five-star Doonbeg golf and hotel complex in County Clare, restyling it the Trump International Golf Links, Ireland.
- 12 February – Storm Darwin blew down between 5,000 and 7,000 hectares of forest, including as many as 7.5 million trees, according to the Department of Agriculture. This represents less than one per cent of Ireland's forest volume. Just over ten percent of Ireland is covered by forest.
- 12 February – A vehicle belonging to the Police Service of Northern Ireland drove across the border into County Donegal.

=== March ===
- 17 March – Saint Patrick's Day, the national holiday.
- 30 March – Mothering Sunday. Clocks went forward one hour when Irish Standard Time (IST) began.

=== April ===
- 7 April – President Higgins departed from Áras an Uachtaráin with full military honours as he and his wife left for London in preparation for his state visit to Britain.
- 8–11 April – Michael D. Higgins paid the first state visit by an Irish President to the United Kingdom.
  - 8 April – Queen Elizabeth welcomed President Higgins to Windsor Castle as her guest. Later, Higgins addressed both Houses of Parliament in Westminster. In the evening, he was the guest of honour at a state banquet in Windsor Castle.
  - 9 April – President Higgins viewed the Colours of the disbanded Irish Regiments at Windsor Castle with Prince Andrew, the Duke of York, visited University College London Hospital, and was the guest of Prime Minister David Cameron for lunch at 10 Downing Street.
- 21 April – Easter Monday (public holiday).
- 24 April – President Higgins received the Freedom of Cork in the City Hall from Lord Mayor Catherine Clancy.
- Late April – The Molly Malone statue was removed from its original location at the base of Grafton Street to make way for the new Luas tracks which skirt around Trinity College. It was relocated in July.

=== May ===
- 5 May – May Day and Labour Day (public holiday).
- 6 May – The appointment of 36 new ambassadors, 12 of them women, was announced by the Government, including the appointment of an official of the Department of Foreign Affairs and Trade as Irish ambassador to the Vatican, an embassy due to reopen in the next few months, following its closure in 2011. This increased the number of Irish ambassadors to 80.
- 7 May – Minister for Justice and Equality and Minister for Defence, Alan Shatter, resigned as a result of the inquiry by Senior Counsel Séan Guerin into allegations of Garda Síochána malpractice.
- 8 May
  - Frances Fitzgerald was appointed Minister for Justice and Equality to replace her colleague, Alan Shatter, and Charlie Flanagan replaced her as Minister for Children and Youth Affairs. Enda Kenny became interim Minister for Defence.
  - President Higgins departed for a six-day, second official visit to the United States.
- 15 May – The Minister for Finance, Michael Noonan announced that Budget Day would probably be on 14 October, or else on the following day.
- 16 May
  - The Committee of Social Rights of the Council of Europe ruled that, for the first time since the formation of the police force, members of the Garda Síochána could join a labour union and would be allowed to strike.
  - Waterford Regional Hospital was formally re-named University Hospital Waterford (UHW) by the Minister for Health, Dr. James Reilly.
- 20 May – The Rosie Hackett Bridge across the River Liffey in Dublin was opened to connect Marlborough Street and Hawkins Street. It is dedicated to public transport including buses and the Luas tram, as well as cyclists and pedestrians.
- 23 May – Voting took place throughout the country from 7 am until 10 pm in European and local elections, as well as in two by-elections, in the Dublin West and Longford–Westmeath constituencies.
- 25 May – The story of the unrecorded burials of 796 children who died at the Bon Secours Mother and Baby Home in Tuam, County Galway between 1925 and 1961, which was reported by The Tuam Herald over the previous two years, gained sensational national and, later, international coverage following publication of a new article in a Sunday newspaper.
- 26 May – Tánaiste and Minister for Foreign Affairs and Trade, Eamon Gilmore, announced his intention to resign his position as leader of the Labour Party following the serious collapse of public support for his party in the local and European elections three days before. The resignation takes effect when his successor is chosen.

=== June ===
- 2 June – June public holiday.
- 3 June – The counties of North Tipperary and South Tipperary were amalgamated into one County Tipperary.
- 7 June – British viewers were amazed, confused and impressed when Sky Sports broadcast a hurling match for the first time.
- 13 June – The Public Health (Standardised Packaging of Tobacco) Bill 2014 was published, making Ireland the first European Union (EU) country to introduce plain cigarette packaging legislation. Stiff tobacco industry resistance to the law is expected and United States business and political lobbies have approached the Taoiseach to warn that its enactment would affect foreign investment in Ireland. Some EU countries are also expected to fight the legislation.
- 15 June – Father's Day.

=== July ===
- 4 July – Joan Burton was elected leader of the Labour Party, succeeding Eamon Gilmore. She was also appointed Tánaiste by the Taoiseach, Enda Kenny, following Gilmore's resignation from that position. Burton is the first female Labour Party leader and the third female tánaiste. Alan Kelly was elected deputy Labour Party leader.
- 14 July
  - Former President of Ireland, Mary Robinson was appointed as the United Nations Special Envoy for Climate Change.
  - It was confirmed that planned concerts at Croke Park by the United States singer Garth Brooks were cancelled following the refusal to grant an event licence by Dublin City Council for a five-concert series owing to the existence of a binding signed agreement between local residents, the Gaelic Athletic Association, and the promoter, that concerts at the venue would be limited to three per year. This limit was already reached during a three-concert series earlier in the year.
- Undated in July – The Molly Malone statue was placed in its new location outside the Dublin Tourist Office (formerly St. Andrew's Church) on Suffolk Street in Dublin.

=== August ===
- 4 August – August public holiday.
- 5 August – A state of emergency was declared at Letterkenny General Hospital as torrential rain caused flooding for the second consecutive year.
- 21 August – The post-mortem room of Letterkenny General Hospital was sealed off when the body of a man with suspected Ebola virus disease, who had been working in Sierra Leone, was brought there.

=== October ===
- 11 October
  - 130,000 people marched from Parnell Square to Dáil Éireann in Dublin to protest against new water supply charges.
  - Two by-election counts were performed following polls on the previous day. Paul Murphy of the Anti-Austerity Alliance won in Dublin South-West, while Independent candidate Michael Fitzmaurice won in Roscommon–South Leitrim.
- 14 October – The 2015 Budget was announced.
- 26 October – Clocks went back one hour when Irish Standard Time (IST) ended and the country changed to Greenwich Mean Time for winter.
- 27 October – October public holiday.
- 31 October – Hallowe'en.

=== November ===
- 22 November
  - Revised Irish Water charges were announced. The cap on charges will now be €60 for a one-adult household and €160 for all other households.
  - The five-metre cross on the summit of Ireland's highest mountain, Carrauntoohil, was found by climbers to have been cut down with an angle grinder. The steel cross, erected by 100 people in 1976, replaced an older wooden one erected during the 1950s. The cross was re-erected by a large party a week later, on the 29th, against the objections of environmentalists and members of Atheist Ireland. The anonymous fellers of the cross sent video of their action to TheJournal.ie news provider on 2 December indicating that the incident was a protest against the number of Irish primary schools being run by the Catholic Church.
- 25 November – Nóirín O'Sullivan was appointed as the 20th Commissioner of the Garda Síochána.

=== December ===
- 2 December – 350,000 second-level students were out of school as teachers placed pickets in the row over reform of the Junior Cert.
- 7 December – President Higgins began a nine-day state visit to China where he was scheduled to have meetings with the President, Xi Jinping, the Prime Minister, Li Keqiang, and the Chairman of the National People's Congress, Zhang Dejiang.
- 10 December – Between 30,000 and 100,000 people marched in Dublin to protest against water charges being introduced.
- 25 December – Christmas Day (public holiday).
- 26 December – Saint Stephen's Day (public holiday).

== Arts ==
- April – Tramp Press launched in Dublin by Lisa Coen and Sarah Davis-Goff as an independent publisher specialising in Irish fiction with the publication of Oona Frawley's debut novel Flight.
- Emmet Kirwan's play Dublin Oldschool was produced.
- Niall Williams' novel History of the Rain was published.

== Sports ==
=== Association football ===
International friendly matches

5 March 2014	Republic of Ireland	1 – 2	Serbia	Dublin, Ireland
19:45 UTC±0	Shane Long 7'	Report	James McCarthy 47' (o.g.); Filip Đorđević 59'	Stadium: Lansdowne Road; Attendance: 37,595; Referee: Viktor Kassai (Hungary)

25 May 2014	Republic of Ireland	1 – 2	Turkey	Dublin, Ireland
19:45 UTC+1	Jonathan Walters 78'	Report	Ahmet İlhan Özek 17'; Tarık Çamdal 75'	Stadium: Lansdowne Road; Attendance: 25,191; Referee: Ruddy Buquet (France)

31 May 2014	Italy	0 – 0	Republic of Ireland	Fulham, England
19:45 UTC+1		Report		Stadium: Craven Cottage; Attendance: 22,879; Referee: Michael Oliver (England)

6 June 2014	Costa Rica	1 – 1	Republic of Ireland	Chester, USA
20:00 UTC-4	Celso Borges 64' (pen.)	Report	Kevin Doyle 17'	Stadium: PPL Park; Referee: Raúl Castro (Honduras)

10 June 2014	Republic of Ireland	1 – 5	Portugal	East Rutherford, USA
19:45 UTC-4	James McClean 47'	Report	Hugo Almeida 3', 37'; Richard Keogh 20' (o.g.); Vieirinha 77'; Fábio Coentrão 83'	Stadium: MetLife Stadium; Attendance: 46,063; Referee: Baldomero Toledo (USA)

3 September 2014	Republic of Ireland	2 – 0	Oman	Dublin, Ireland
	Kevin Doyle 20'; Alex Pearce 81'	Report		Stadium: Lansdowne Road; Attendance: 14,376

18 November 2014	Republic of Ireland	4 – 1	United States	Dublin, Ireland
19:45 UTC±0	Anthony Pilkington 7'; Robbie Brady 55', 86'; James McClean 82'	Report	Mix Diskerud 39'	Stadium: Lansdowne Road; Attendance: 33,332; Referee: Paweł Raczkowski (Poland)

UEFA Euro 2016 qualifying Group D

7 September 2014 Group D	Georgia	1 – 2	Republic of Ireland	Tbilisi, Georgia
20:00 UTC+4	Tornike Okriashvili 38'	Report	Aiden McGeady 24', 90'	Stadium: Dinamo Arena; Referee: Kevin Blom (Netherlands)

11 October 2014 Group D	Republic of Ireland	7 – 0	Gibraltar	Dublin, Ireland
17:00	Robbie Keane 6', 14', 18' (pen.); James McClean 46', 53'; Wes Hoolahan 56'	Report	Jordan Perez 52' (o.g.)	Stadium: Lansdowne Road; Referee: Leontios Trattou (Cyprus)

14 October 2014 Group D	Germany	1 – 1	Republic of Ireland	Gelsenkirchen, Germany
20:45	Toni Kroos 71'	Report	John O'Shea 90+4'	Stadium: Veltins-Arena; Attendance: 51,204; Referee: Damir Skomina (Slovenia)

14 November 2014 Group D	Scotland	1 – 0	Republic of Ireland	Glasgow, Scotland
19:45 UTC+1	Shaun Maloney 75'	Report		Stadium: Celtic Park; Attendance: 55,000; Referee: Milorad Mažić (Serbia)

=== Cycling ===
- 11 May – Stage three of the 2014 Giro d'Italia started in Armagh and finished in Dublin.

=== Gaelic games ===
2014 All-Ireland Senior Hurling Championship Final

- 7 September – Kilkenny 3–22 – 1–28 Tipperary

2014 All-Ireland Senior Hurling Championship Final Replay

- 27 September – Kilkenny 2–17 – 2–14 Tipperary

2014 All-Ireland Senior Football Championship Final

- 21 September – Donegal 0–12 – 2–9 Kerry

=== Horse racing ===
Irish Grand National steeplechase

- 21 April – Shutthefrontdoor (Barry Geraghty)

=== Rugby union ===
2014 Six Nations Championship

- 2 February – Ireland 28–6 Scotland.
- 8 February – Ireland 26–3 Wales.
- 22 February – England 13–10 Ireland.
- 8 March – Ireland 46–7 Italy.
- 15 March – France 20–22 Ireland.

2014 Summer Internationals

- 7 June – Argentina 17–29 Ireland.
- 14 June – Argentina 17–23 Ireland.

2014 Autumn Internationals

- 8 November – Ireland 29–15 South Africa.
- 16 November – Ireland 49–7 Georgia.
- 22 November – Ireland 26–23 Australia.

== Deaths ==
=== January ===
- 2 January – Patrick Heron, 61; author, cancer.
- 7 January – Joe O'Mahony, 65; former Limerick F.C. football player, illness.
- 10 January – Anthony J. Hederman, 92, judge, Attorney General (1977–1981).
- 15 January – Liam Hogan, 74, former Limerick hurler, short illness.
- 19 January – Peadar Clohessy, 70, politician, Teachta Dála (TD) for Limerick East (1981–1982 and 1987–1997).
- 20 January – John Mackey, 96, Roman Catholic prelate, Bishop of Auckland (1974–1983).
- 26 January –
  - Ollie Conmy, 74, football player.
  - Barry Nash, 18; All-Ireland minor handball champion, road traffic accident.
- 27 January – Shane Hourigan, 44; hurling referee, road traffic accident.
- 28 January – Ted Nealon, 84; former journalist, broadcaster, and Fine Gael party TD for Sligo–Leitrim, illness.
- 29 January – Paddy Whelan, 78; former Irish Times photographer, suspected heart attack.
- 30 January
  - John Carty, 63; former Fianna Fáil party TD for Mayo.
  - Seán Flynn, 56; education correspondent with the Irish Times, illness.
  - Jim Mansfield, 74; businessman, long illness.
  - Joan Tighe, 91; fashion journalist, short illness.

=== February ===
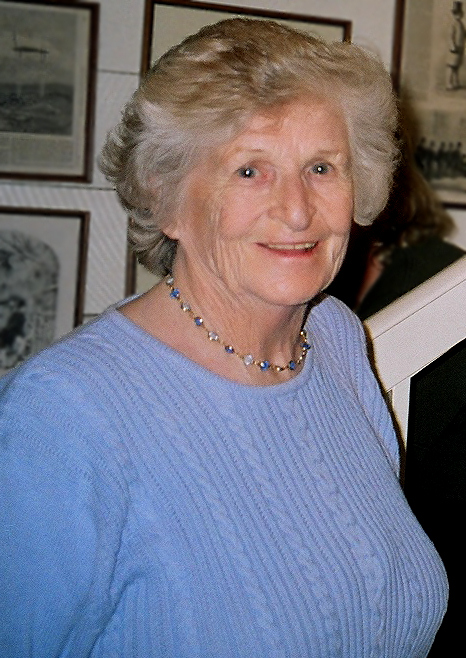
Ronnie Masterson

- 1 February – Jonny Byrne, 19; Carlow under-21 hurler, drowning.
- 7 February – Ernie Lyons, 99, motorcycle racer.
- 8 February – Finbarr Dwyer, 67, accordion player.
- 11 February –
  - Ronnie Masterson, 87; actress.
  - Seán Potts, 83; whistle player.
- 13 February – Tommy Cooke, 99; Limerick hurler and oldest living All-Ireland medallist.
- 14 February – Patrick Scott, 93; artist.
- 17 February – James McNaughton, 51; Antrim hurler.
- 18 February – Maigread Murphy, 94; teacher, patron of the arts and widow of sculptor Séamus Murphy.
- 20 February – Ted Joyce, 90; former Carlow Gaelic footballer.
- 24 February – Peadar Smith, 85; former Louth Gaelic footballer.
- 27 February – Raymond James Boland, 82, Irish-born American Roman Catholic prelate, Bishop of Birmingham in Alabama (1988–1993) and Kansas City-St Joseph (1993–2005), complications from lung cancer.

=== March ===
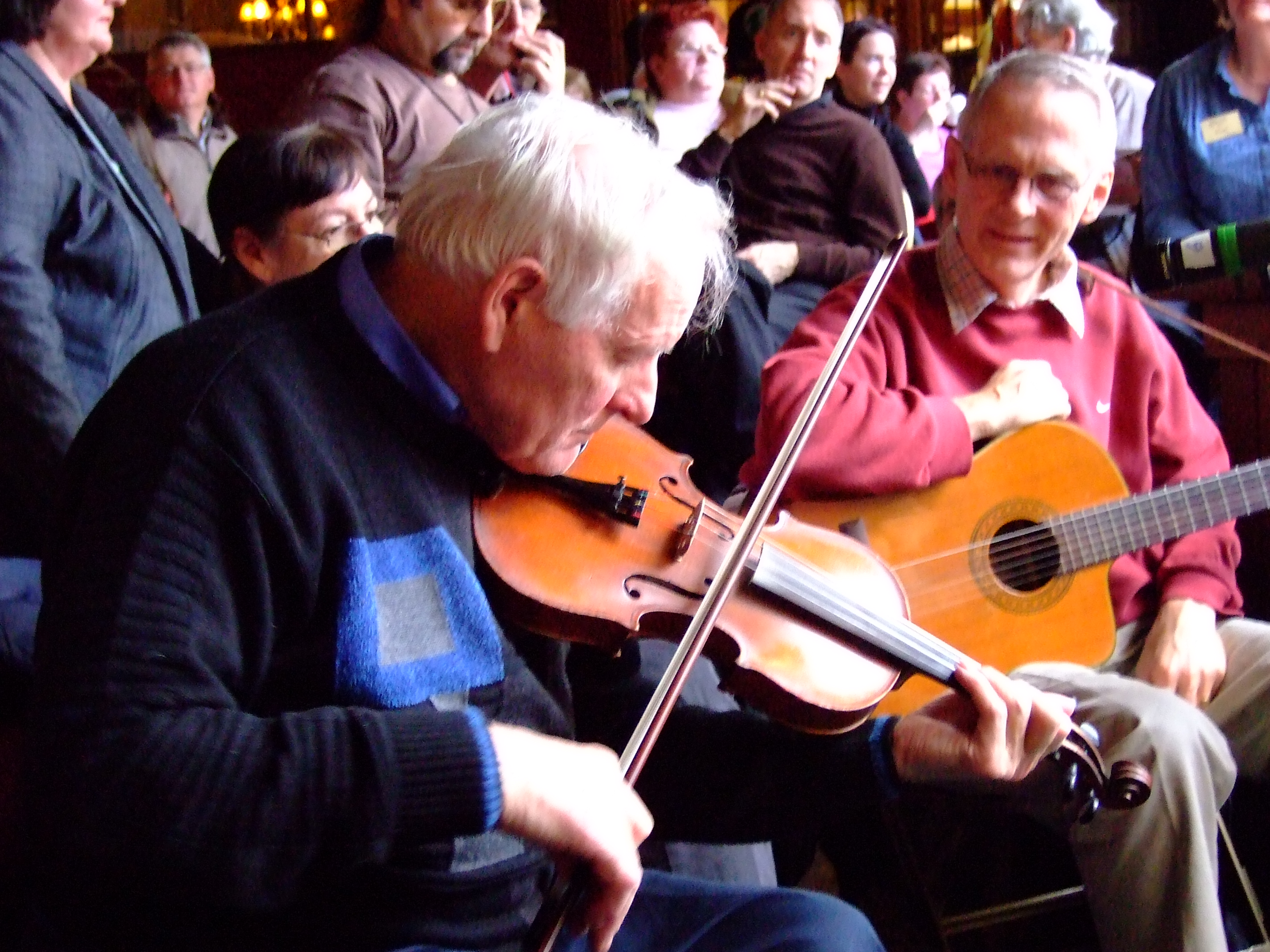
Paddy Cronin

- 3 March – Gerry Collins, 57; former Dublin Gaelic footballer and face of Health Service Executive anti-smoking campaign, lung cancer.
- 4 March – Barrie Cooke, 83, artist.
- 6 March – Tony Herbert, 94, politician (14th & 16th Senator), and hurler (Limerick).
- 10 March – Eileen Colgan, 80; actress.
- 11 March – Christine Buckley, 67; institutional abuse survivor and campaigner, cancer.
- 13 March – Edward Haughey, Baron Ballyedmond, 70; entrepreneur and former politician, helicopter crash.
- 15 March – Paddy Cronin, 88; fiddler, short illness.
- 17 March –
  - Charlie O'Mahony, 73; former Cork Celtic footballer, long illness.
  - Paddy McGuigan, 74, songwriter ("The Men Behind the Wire", "Boys of the Old Brigade") and musician (The Barleycorn).
- 20 March – Shane MacThomais, 46; historian, suddenly.
- 21 March – Oliver Maloney, 77; former Director-General of RTÉ, illness.
- 25 March –
  - Nicky McFadden, 51; Fine Gael TD, motor neuron disease.
  - Frank O'Keeffe, 91; former Kerry Gaelic footballer.

=== April ===
- 3 April – John Ryan, 86; former Labour Party TD.
- 22 April – John Hannigan, 75; former Donegal Gaelic footballer and manager, short illness.
- 29 April – Daphne Pochin Mould, 93, author and photographer.

=== May ===
- 15 May – Greg Hughes, 75, Gaelic footballer (Offaly).

=== June ===
- 4 June – Martin Treacy, 78, retired hurler (Kilkenny).
- 15 June – Ambrose O'Gorman, 102, oldest priest in Ireland.
- 25 June – The Very Reverend Cyril Haran, 83, priest and Gaelic football manager (Sligo).
- 27 June – Flor Hayes, 70: Gaelic footballer (Cork), short illness.
- 28 June – Joe Dooley, hurler (Offaly).
- 29 June – Dermot Healy, 66, novelist, playwright and poet.

=== July ===
- 3 July – Tim Flood, 87: former hurler (Wexford).
- 4 July – Packie McQuaid, former Gaelic footballer (Monaghan).
- 7 July – Denis Lyons, 78, former Fianna Fáil TD, short illness.
- 13 July – Jeremy Browne, 11th Marquess of Sligo, 75, hereditary peer.
- 20 July – Thomas Brennan, 74, equestrian.
- 22 July – Louis Lentin, 80, theatre, film and television director, sudden illness.

=== August ===
- 8 August – J. J. Murphy, 86, actor (Cal, Angela's Ashes, Game of Thrones)
- 10 August – Ann Rowan, 85, actress (The Riordans, Father Ted).
- 16 August – Liam Flood, 71, bookmaker and poker player.
- 20 August – Eric Barber, 72, association footballer (Shelbourne).
- 21 August – Albert Reynolds, 81, politician, Taoiseach (1992–1994), TD for Longford–Roscommon (1992–2002).

=== September ===
- 2 September – James White, 76, politician and hotelier.
- 12 September – Ian Paisley, former First Minister and founder of the DUP
- 20 September – Billie Barry, dance instructor.
- 29 September – Hugh Doherty, 93, association footballer (Celtic).

=== October ===
- 13 October – Gabrielle Reidy, 54, actress, cancer.
- 19 October – Gerard Parkes, 90, actor.
- 22 October – Barry McSweeney, Irish scientist, Chief Science Advisor (2004–2005).

=== November ===
- 4 November – Jack Fitzsimons, 84, architect and activist.
- 5 November – Séamus Heery, 87, Gaelic footballer (Meath).
- 8 November – Joe Walsh, 71, former Fianna Fáil TD and long serving Minister for Agriculture.
- 9 November – Luke Dolan, 108, Ireland's oldest man.
- 10 November – Brian Farrell, 85, political broadcaster and academic.
- 13 November –
  - Gus Cremins, 93, Gaelic football player (Kerry GAA).
  - Paddy MacHugh, first Telefís Éireann weather forecaster, short illness.
- 14 November – Michael O'Brien, 81, former Cork senior hurling team coach, long illness.
- 16 November – Dessie Hughes, 71, racehorse trainer and former jockey, short illness.
- 19 November – Jeremiah Coffey, 81, Roman Catholic prelate, Bishop of Sale, Australia (1989–2008).
- 26 November – Anita Notaro, author and former television director, front-temporal dementia.
- 27 November – Jack Kyle, 88, rugby union player, long illness.

=== December ===
- 5 December – Jackie Healy-Rae, 83, former Independent TD, long illness.
- 6 December – Mick Barry, 95, road bowler regarded as the greatest of all time, long illness.
- 16 December – Andy Kettle, 68, chairman of the Dublin County Board, pneumonia.
- 26 December – Timothy Dowd, 99, detective who led Son of Sam manhunt.
- 27 December – Pat Gillen, 89, one of the last surviving Irish D Day veterans.
- 30 December – Desmond Fisher, 94, journalist, broadcaster and former head of current affairs with RTÉ.

== See also ==
- List of Irish films of 2014
- 2014 in Irish television
