= List of storms named Tina =

The name Tina has been used for two tropical cyclones in the Northeastern Pacific, one in the Western Pacific, one in the Australian region, and one in the South Pacific.

In the Northeastern Pacific:

- Hurricane Tina (1992) – a Category 4 hurricane that became the longest-lived Pacific hurricane at the time
- Tropical Storm Tina (2016) – maintained tropical characteristics for only 30 hours

In the Western Pacific:

- Typhoon Tina (1997) (T9711, 12W, Huling) – affected the Ryukyu Islands and South Korea

In the Australian region:

- Cyclone Tina (1990) – affected Western Australia

In the South Pacific:

- Cyclone Tina (1974) – a Category 2 tropical cyclone

== See also ==
- List of storms named Tia – a similar name that has also been used in the South Pacific
- Cyclone Tini (2014) – a European windstorm with a similar name
- List of storms named Tino – a similar name that has also been used in the West Pacific and South Pacific
- Cyclone Trina (2001) – a South Pacific tropical cyclone with a similar name
