= Joseph Dooley =

Joseph Dooley may refer to:

- Joseph Brannon Dooley (1889–1967), United States federal judge
- Joe Dooley (basketball) (born 1966), basketball player
- Joe Dooley (Seir Kieran hurler) (born 1963), Irish hurling manager and former player
- Joe Dooley (St Rynagh's hurler) (?–2014), Irish hurler
