= List of storms named Tino =

The name Tino has been used for five tropical cyclones worldwide.

In the Western Pacific:

The name was used for four tropical cyclones in the Philippine Area of Responsibility by PAGASA. It replaced the unused name Talahib following the 2001 Pacific typhoon season.

- Tropical Depression 24W (2009) (24W, Tino) – existed east of the Philippines
- Typhoon Wipha (2013) (T1326, 25W, Tino) – caused over $400 million (2013 USD) in damages in Japan
- Tropical Storm Kirogi (2017) (T1725, 31W, Tino) – made landfall in Vietnam
- Typhoon Kalmaegi (2025) (T2525, 31W, Tino) – a deadly and destructive typhoon that heavily impacted Visayas in the Philippines and Vietnam.

The name Tino was retired following the 2025 Pacific typhoon season was replaced with Tala, which means star in Tagalog, for the 2029 season.

In the South Pacific:

- Cyclone Tino (2020) – affected ten island nations across the South Pacific

== See also ==
- List of storms named Tina – a similar name that has also been used in the South Pacific Ocean, West Pacific Ocean, and two other tropical cyclone basins
- Cyclone Tini (2014) – similarly-named European windstorm also known as Storm Darwin
