= 2017 in Ireland =

- Centuries: 19th; 20th; 21st
- Decades: 1990s; 2000s; 2010s; 2020s
- See also: 2017 in Northern Ireland; Other events of 2017; List of years in Ireland

Events during the year 2017 in Ireland.

== Incumbents ==
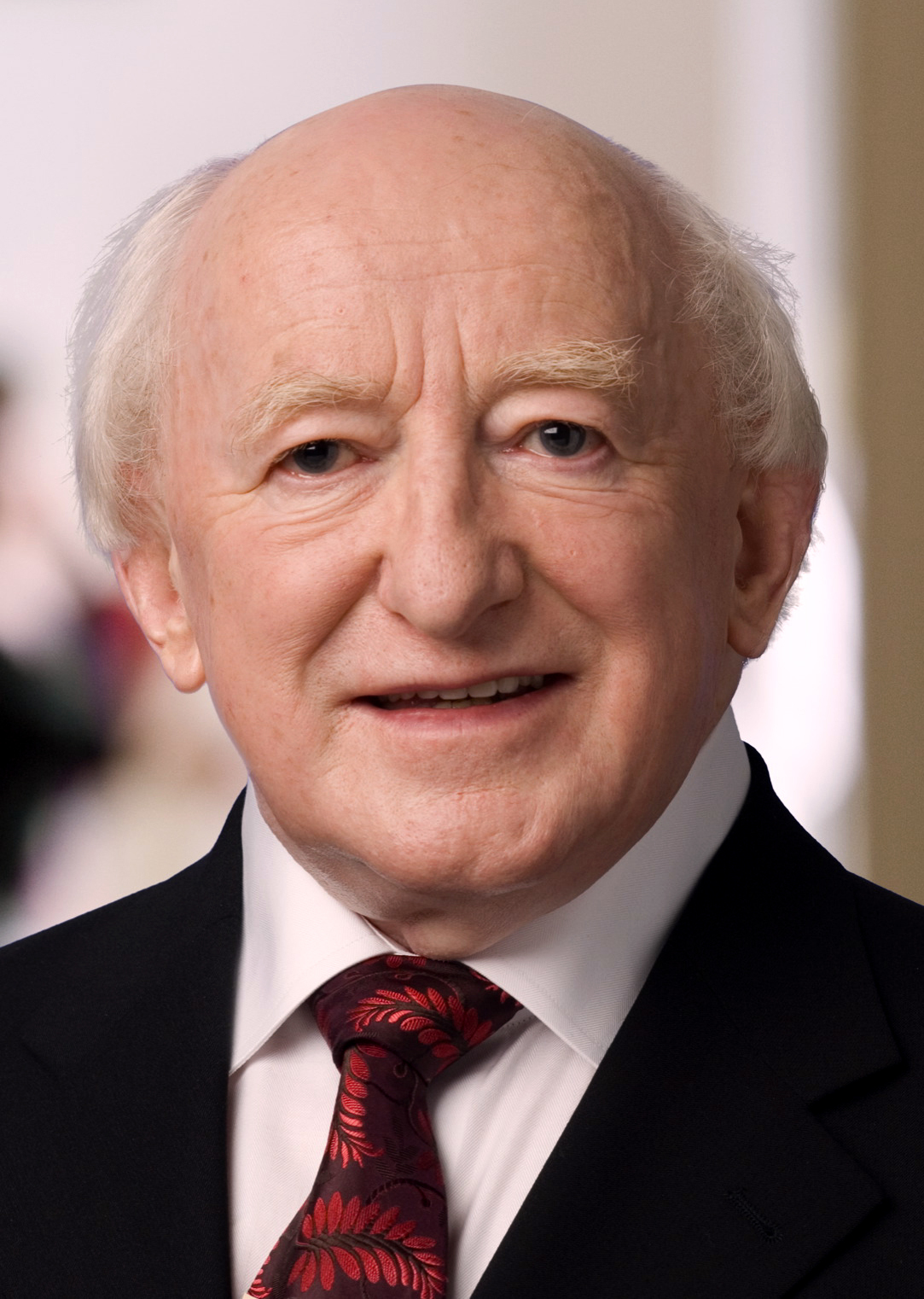
President Michael D. Higgins

- President: Michael D. Higgins
- Taoiseach:
  - Enda Kenny (FG) (until 14 June 2017)
  - Leo Varadkar (FG) (from 14 June 2017)
- Tánaiste:
  - Frances Fitzgerald (FG) (until 28 November 2017)
  - Simon Coveney (FG) (from 30 November 2017)
- Minister for Finance:
  - Michael Noonan (FG) (until 14 June 2017)
  - Paschal Donohoe (FG) (from 14 June 2017)
- Chief Justice:
  - Susan Denham (until 26 July 2017)
  - Frank Clarke (from 26 July 2017)
- Dáil: 32nd
- Seanad: 25th

== Events ==
=== January ===
- 2 January – The Minister for Communications, Climate Action and Environment, Denis Naughten, suffered minor injuries and was hospitalised after being struck by a car while cycling with his wife near Roscommon.
- 3 January – The Irish Nurses and Midwives Organisation noted that there had been a record 612 patients admitted for care on trolleys in hospitals around the country this morning.
- 7 January – The second meeting of the Citizens' Assembly took place. The assembly was told how new neo-natal screenings which can detect chromosomal disorders such as Down syndrome pose ethical issues for society.
- 11 January – Members of a cross-party delegation group of teachtaí dála (TDs) described as "useful and productive" a meeting with the Egyptian president about the continuing imprisonment without trial of Irish citizen Ibrahim Halawa.
- 19 January – The Sinn Féin party's Martin McGuinness announced his retirement from politics, citing health reasons.
- 20 January – A Women's March took place in Dublin. The march was organised by the Abortion Rights Campaign, Amnesty International Ireland, European Network Against Racism, ROSA, and The Coalition to Repeal the 8th. Events also took place in County Galway and Castlebar, County Mayo.
- 23 January – Three men were arrested as part of an investigation into an international illegal immigrant smuggling network through Dublin Airport. Two of those arrested were Aer Lingus employees at the airport.
- 30 January – Taoiseach Enda Kenny and British Prime Minister Theresa May held talks at Government Buildings on the United Kingdom's exit from the European Union and the effects on Anglo-Irish relations.
- 31 January – Around one hundred farmers participated in an Irish Farmers Association protest outside the Department of Agriculture in Dublin to highlight their anger over delays in payments to farmers for their participation in the GLAS agri-environment scheme.

=== February ===
- 2 February – British Brexit Secretary David Davis told the House of Commons that the UK's relationship with Ireland was one of the most important aspects of Brexit preparations.
- 6 February – Dublin City Council passed a motion to grant the Freedom of the City to former US President Barack Obama and his wife, Michelle.
- 15 February
  - Taoiseach Enda Kenny rejected the suggestion that Ireland should leave European Union, in a major Brexit speech.
  - The Dáil passed a Fine Gael party motion of confidence in the Government, tabled in response to Sinn Féin's motion of no confidence, announced over the handling of the response to the Sergeant Maurice McCabe affair.
- 22 February – Following a week of speculation concerning his future as leader of the Fine Gael party, Enda Kenny told a meeting of his parliamentary party that he would deal with his future effectively and conclusively after the annual Saint Patrick's Day visit to the White House in Washington DC.
- 23 February – Speaking in Brussels the Taoiseach said he wanted the final Brexit agreement between the European Union and Britain to allow for Irish reunification, in line with the terms of the Good Friday Agreement.

=== March ===
- 1 March – The Taoiseach Enda Kenny announced in the Dáil the formal recognition by the State of Irish Travellers – numbering 40,000 people in Ireland and Northern Ireland – as an indigenous ethnic minority. He said, "It is a historic day for our Travellers and a proud day for Ireland." President Michael D. Higgins welcomed the event as a "momentous decision".
- 3 March – "Significant quantities" of human remains were discovered at the site of the former Bon Secours Mother and Baby Home in Tuam, County Galway. It came after the Mother and Baby Homes Commission of Investigation began test excavations at the site of the children's burial ground following allegations about the deaths of 800 babies in Tuam over a number of decades and the manner in which they were buried.
- 14 March
  - Two crew members of the Coast Guard were killed and two more were missing after a search and rescue helicopter crashed off the coast of County Mayo.
  - The International Astronomical Union assigned the official Irish- and Latin-language name Mearcair Planitia ("Planet Mercury") to a large lava plain on the surface of the planet Mercury. The name was suggested by Paul Byrne, an Irish planetary scientist from County Kildare.
- 15 March
  - The British government ruled out introducing Irish border posts after leaving the European Union.
  - Irishwoman Danielle McLaughlin was found dead in a tourist resort in Canacona, a district in the south of Goa, India.
- 16 March – Taoiseach Enda Kenny met US President Donald Trump at the White House. The two leaders discussed the election in Northern Ireland and the potential issues concerning the Irish border due to Brexit. Trump also confirmed that he would visit Ireland during his term of office.
- 20 March – The Irish poet Seamus Heaney was honoured by the International Astronomical Union when it assigned the official name Heaney to a 120 kilometre-diameter crater on the surface of Mercury. The name was suggested by Jack Wright, a research student from Belfast. Craters on Mercury are named after dead artists, authors and poets.
- 21 March – Former deputy first minister of Northern Ireland Martin McGuinness died in Derry aged 66.
- 22 March – An Irish person was among 40 people injured in a terrorist attack in Westminster in London.
- 24 March – Bus Éireann staff begin a nationwide strike.
- 31 March – Iarnród Éireann railway and Dublin Bus services were stopped by Bus Éireann during the morning rush hour. The wildcat strikes ended at 10 am.

=== April ===
- 2 April – Authorities at Rosslare Europort discovered 14 people hidden in the back of a refrigerated truck that arrived from France.
- 9 April – The government announced that it would not oppose a bill put forward by a group of independent senators that proposed an end to the 90-year-old restriction on the sale of alcohol on Good Friday.
- 13 April – Dublin Bus workers voted to strike in solidarity with picketing Bus Éireann staff, a move which came as the Bus Éireann strike was called off temporarily as the Labour Court issued its recommendations.
- 20 April – Enda Kenny became Fine Gael's longest serving Taoiseach, having surpassed the record of John A. Costello by completing his 2,234th day in office.
- 23 April – The Citizens' Assembly voted to recommend an extensive liberalisation of the grounds on which abortion was available in Ireland. The Assembly voted to recommend that terminations of pregnancy should be available in Ireland with "no restriction as to reasons" by a margin of 64 percent to 36 percent.
- 27 April
  - Enda Kenny told the Fine Gael party and the media that he would deal with his future as Taoiseach before the end of May.
  - Dr. Peter Boylan resigned from the board of the National Maternity Hospital over a row that nuns would be running the new hospital.
- 28 April – Professor Chris Fitzpatrick resigned from the board of the National Maternity Hospital in support of Dr. Peter Boylan who also resigned from the board over a row that nuns would the running the new maternity hospital.
- 29 April – At a special European Union Brexit conference, there was a formal acknowledgement by EU leaders of the possibility of Northern Ireland rejoining the EU as part of a united Ireland post-Brexit.

=== May ===
- 10 May – Prince Charles of the United Kingdom and the Duchess of Cornwall began a three-day trip to Ireland. They visited counties Antrim, Down, Kilkenny, Wicklow, Kildare, and Glasnevin Cemetery.
- 11 May – The EU's chief Brexit negotiator Michel Barnier addressed a joint sitting of the Dáil and the Seanad.
- 17 May – Taoiseach Enda Kenny announced that he would retire as Fine Gael party leader at midnight. He would remain Taoiseach until a new party leader was elected on 2 June.
- 23 May – The former chairman and chief executive of Anglo Irish Bank, Seán FitzPatrick, was acquitted of 27 charges against him for misleading the bank's auditors and furnishing false information about multi-million euro loans to him and to people connected to him between 2002 and 2007.

=== June ===
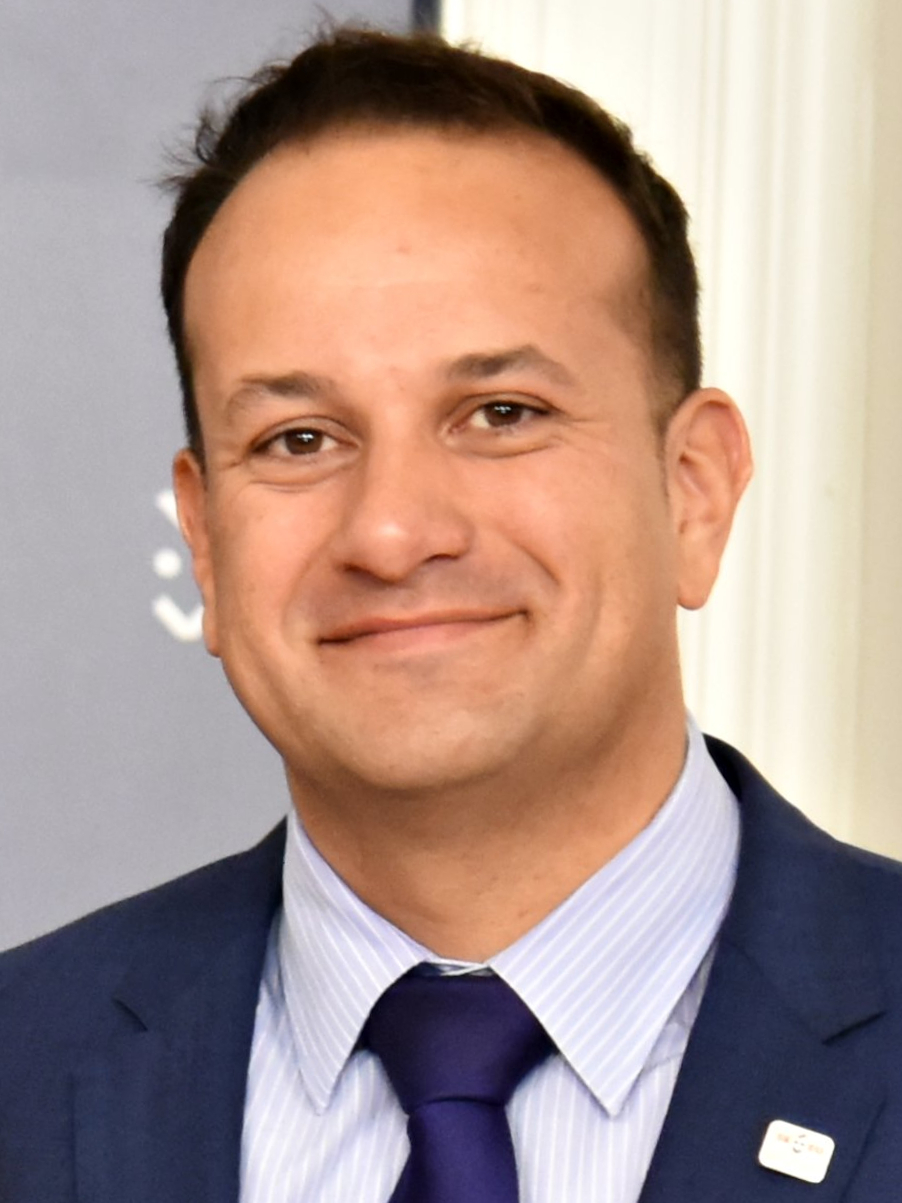
Leo Varadkar became the first openly gay Taoiseach elected by Dáil Éireann

- 2 June – Leo Varadkar was elected Leader of Fine Gael, becoming the youngest leader of the party. He was the first openly gay leader of Fine Gael and the first leader of Fine Gael educated at Trinity College Dublin.
- 13 June – Enda Kenny tendered his resignation as Taoiseach to President Higgins at Áras an Uachtaráin.
- 14 June – Leo Varadkar was elected Taoiseach by Dáil Éireann and was later appointed by President Higgins.
- 29 June – Six men, including Socialist Party TD Paul Murphy, who were on trial for the false imprisonment of former Tánaiste Joan Burton and her adviser, were found not guilty by a jury at the Circuit Criminal Court.

=== July ===
- 9 July – Two men drowned off the coast of Donegal while on a fishing trip.
- 26 July – Frank Clarke was named as the new Chief Justice by the government.

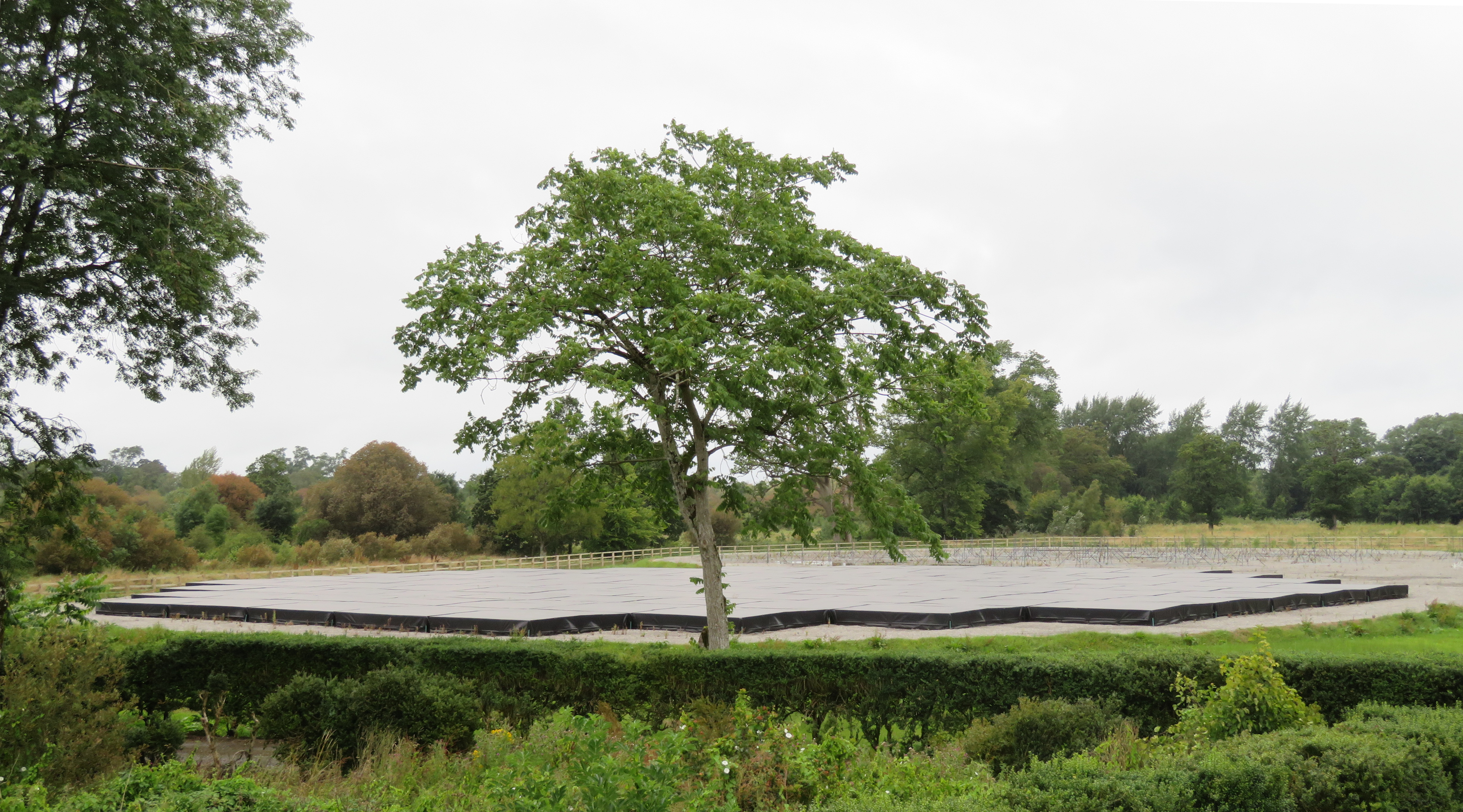
The Irish node of the LOFAR radio telescope (I-Lofar) at Birr Castle Desmesne

- 27 July – The I-LOFAR radio telescope first light opening ceremony took place at Birr Castle Desmesne in County Offaly.

=== August ===
- 4 August – Taoiseach Leo Varadkar made a 'bridges not borders' speech in Belfast.
- 16 August – The UK published its Brexit plan regarding Northern Ireland and the plan stated they did not wish to go back to border posts.
- 17 August – Two Irish people were injured in a terrorist attack in Barcelona.
- 22–23 August – A major storm caused serious damage in Donegal.

=== September ===
- 5 September – The Sinn Féin party leader Gerry Adams announced he would reveal his plan for resigning as leader in November.
- 7 September – The government announced it would repay early, and in full, the outstanding €5.5 billion owed to the International Monetary Fund, Sweden and Denmark.
- 10 September – Garda Síochána Commissioner Noirin O'Sullivan announced her resignation after three years of service.
- 12 September – The former US Vice President Joe Biden turned the first sod on a hospice to be built in Castlebar, County Mayo. Biden was accompanied by his brother Jimmy and nephew Jamie.
- 22 September – Taoiseach Leo Varadkar gave a "cautious welcome" to the British Prime Minister's Brexit speech in Florence.
- 25 September – Taoiseach Leo Varadkar met British Prime Minister Theresa May in London where they discussed Brexit and trade deals.
- 26 September – Taoiseach Leo Varadkar confirmed Ireland would hold six or seven referendums between 2018 and 2019.

=== October ===
- 4 October – Former Taoiseach Liam Cosgrave died aged 97 at Tallaght Hospital.
- 16 October – As the remnants of Hurricane Ophelia swept across Ireland, four people were killed, one injured, the Department of Education closed all schools, all bus and train services were cancelled, most supermarkets closed early, flights were cancelled, and colleges closed nationwide.
- 18 October – The Oireachtas Committee on the Eighth Amendment of the Irish Constitution voted not to retain Article 40.3.3 in full.
- 24 October – Ibrahima Halawa arrived back in Ireland after four years of prison in Egypt.
- 27 October – University College Dublin student union president, Katie Ascough, was impeached by 69 percent of students in a vote following her prevention of publication about abortion information in the annual student guide.

=== November ===
- 1 November – The railway company Iarnród Éireann began a nationwide strike, the first of five planned strike days.
- 3 November – The Citizens' Assembly met to discuss climate change.
- 17 November – The minister of Foreign affairs Simon Coveney and the UK Secretary of State for Foreign affairs Boris Johnson met in Dublin to discuss Northern Ireland, Brexit and Europe.
- 18 November – Sinn Féin leader Gerry Adams announced that he would resign as party leader in 2018.
- 28 November – Frances Fitzgerald resigned as Tánaiste over her handling of emails regarding the Garda whistleblower scandal.
- 30 November – Simon Coveney was named as the new Tánaiste.

=== December ===
- 8 December – The Irish and United Kingdom governments agreed on a Brexit deal which ruled out a hard Border.
- 9 December – The Luas Cross City tram service started operating in Dublin.

== Arts and literature ==
- May – The post-punk rock band Fontaines D.C. self-released their first single, "Liberty Belle".
- June – The Kindred Spirits sculpture was unveiled in Midleton, County Cork.
- 8 September – The gothic horror film The Lodgers premiered at the Toronto International Film Festival.
- 2017 – Cairde, an Irish dance group, began at the 2017 Fleadh Cheoil in Ennis, County Clare.

== Sport ==
=== Association football ===
==== Group D ====
- 2018 FIFA World Cup qualification – UEFA Group D

Pos	Team	Pld	W	D	L	GF	GA	GD	Pts	Qualification	Serbia	Ireland	Wales	Austria	Georgia	Moldova
1	Serbia	10	6	3	1	20	10	+10	21	Qualification to 2018 FIFA World Cup	—	2–2	1–1	3–2	1–0	3–0
2	Republic of Ireland	10	5	4	1	12	6	+6	19	Advance to second round	0–1	—	0–0	1–1	1–0	2–0
3	Wales	10	4	5	1	13	6	+7	17		1–1	0–1	—	1–0	1–1	4–0
4	Austria	10	4	3	3	14	12	+2	15		3–2	0–1	2–2	—	1–1	2–0
5	Georgia	10	0	5	5	8	14	−6	5		1–3	1–1	0–1	1–2	—	1–1
6	Moldova	10	0	2	8	4	23	−19	2		0–3	1–3	0–2	0–1	2–2	—

Source: FIFA
11 November 2017
20:45
(20:45 UTC+1)

Denmark	0–0	Republic of Ireland
	Report (FIFA); Report (UEFA)

Parken Stadium, Copenhagen
Attendance: 36,189
Referee: Milorad Mažić (Serbia)
14 November 2017
20:45
(19:45 UTC±0)

Republic of Ireland	1–5	Denmark
Duffy 6'	Report (FIFA); Report (UEFA)	A. Christensen 29'; Eriksen 32', 63', 74'; Bendtner 90' (pen.)

Aviva Stadium, Dublin
Attendance: 50,000
Referee: Szymon Marciniak (Poland)

Denmark won 5–1 on aggregate and qualified for the 2018 FIFA World Cup.

=== Gaelic games ===
2017 All-Ireland Senior Hurling Championship Final

- 3 September – Galway 0-26 – 2-17 Waterford

2017 All-Ireland Senior Football Championship Final

- 17 September – Dublin 1-17 – 1-16 Mayo

=== Rugby Union ===
Ireland finished second to England in the 2017 Six Nations Championship.

== Deaths ==
=== January ===
- 1 January – Therese McGowan, 87, mother of The Pogues lead singer Shane MacGowan, car crash.
- 3 January – Kevin Casey, 40, sports broadcaster, cancer.
- 4 January – Veronica Steele, 69, cheesemaker.
- 5 January – Frank Murphy, 69, middle-distance runner, Parkinson's disease.
- 9 January – T. K. Whitaker, 100, economist and public servant.
- 10 January – Mick Gribbin, 85, Gaelic footballer and coach (Derry).
- 11 January – Victor Griffin, 92, clergyman, theologian and author.
- 14 January
  - Barry Cassin, 92, stage actor and director.
  - Des Cullen, 86, motor sport enthusiast.
- 15 January – Dermot Gallagher, 72, secretary-general at the Department of Foreign Affairs.
- 18 January – Ronan Fanning, 75, historian.
- 19 January – Eddie Filgate, 101, politician, TD (1977–1982).
- 21 January – Eddie Barrett, 68, journalist and NUJ activist.
- 23 January – Owen O'Callaghan, 76, property developer, illness.
- 24 January – Peter Woodman, 73, archaeologist and academic, stroke.

=== February ===
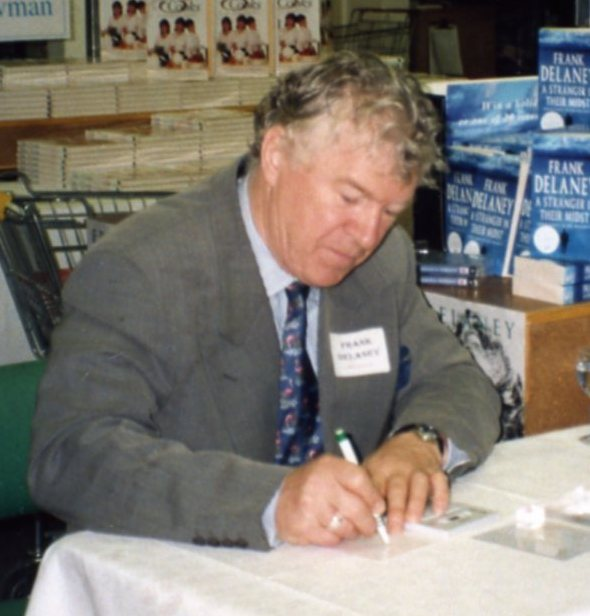
Frank Delaney

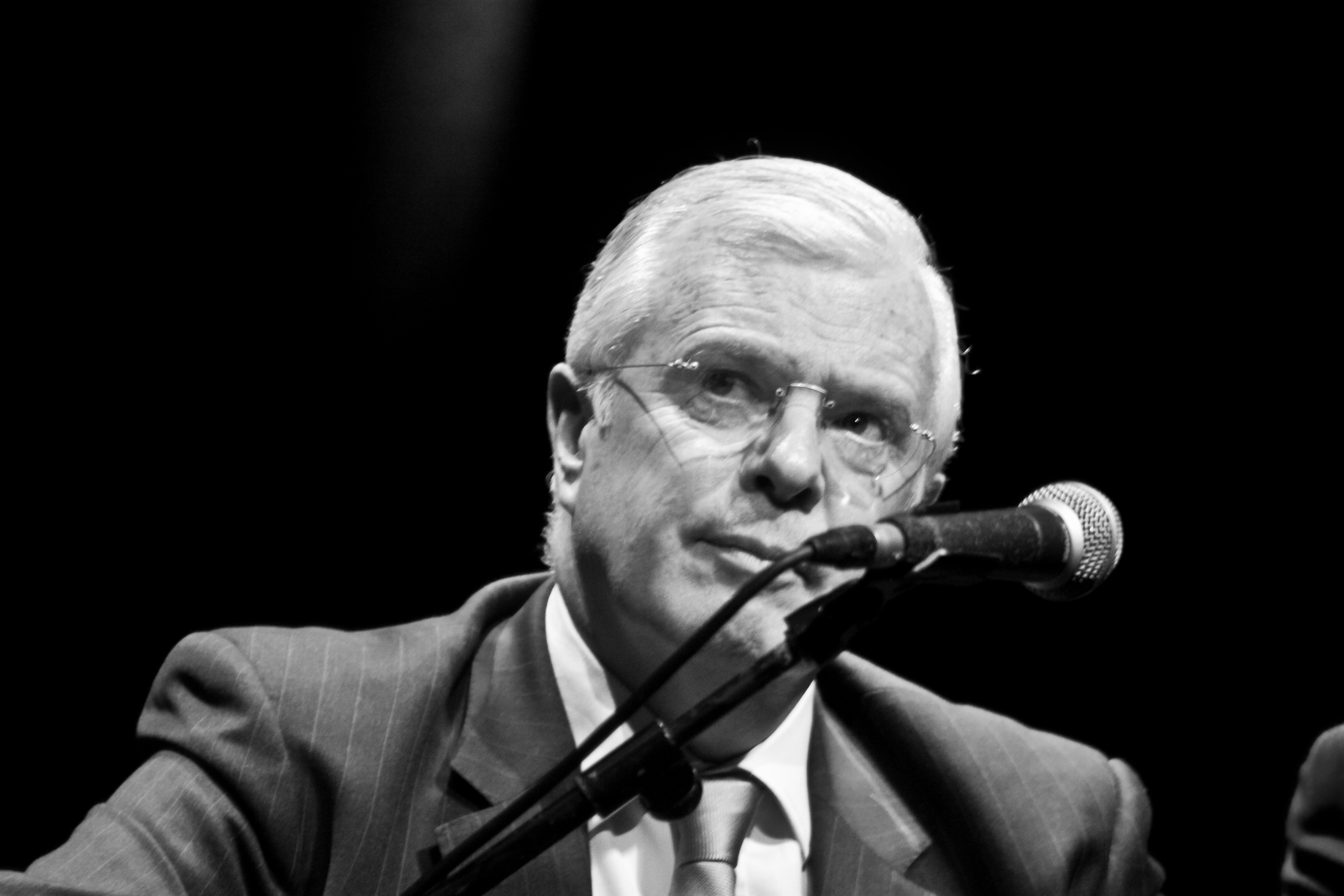
Peter Mathews

- 1 February – Pat O'Malley, 76, wife of Progressive Democrats founder Des O'Malley, cancer.
- 8 February – Brendan McGahon, 80, politician, TD (1982–2002), short illness.
- 13 February
  - Donal Devine, 40, former hurler (Westmeath)
  - Fame and Glory, 10, racehorse, heart attack.
- 18 February
  - Samuel Poyntz, 90, former Bishop of Cork, Cloyne and Ross and Connor.
  - Sulamani, 17, racehorse, short illness.
- 20 February – Leo Murphy, 78, former Gaelic footballer (Down).
- 21 February
  - Desmond Connell, 90, cardinal and former Archbishop of Dublin, long illness.
  - Cosmo Haskard, 100, former Governor of the Falkland Islands and retired British Army officer.
  - Paul McCarthy, 45, former footballer (Brighton & Hove Albion and Wycombe Wanderers).
  - James O'Sullivan, 58, businessman and charity campaigner, cancer.
- 22 February
  - Frank Delaney, 74, novelist, journalist and broadcaster.
  - Stephen Rhodes, 66, broadcaster, motor neurone disease.
- 27 February – Peter Mathews, 65, economist and politician, TD (2011–2016), oesophageal cancer.

=== March ===
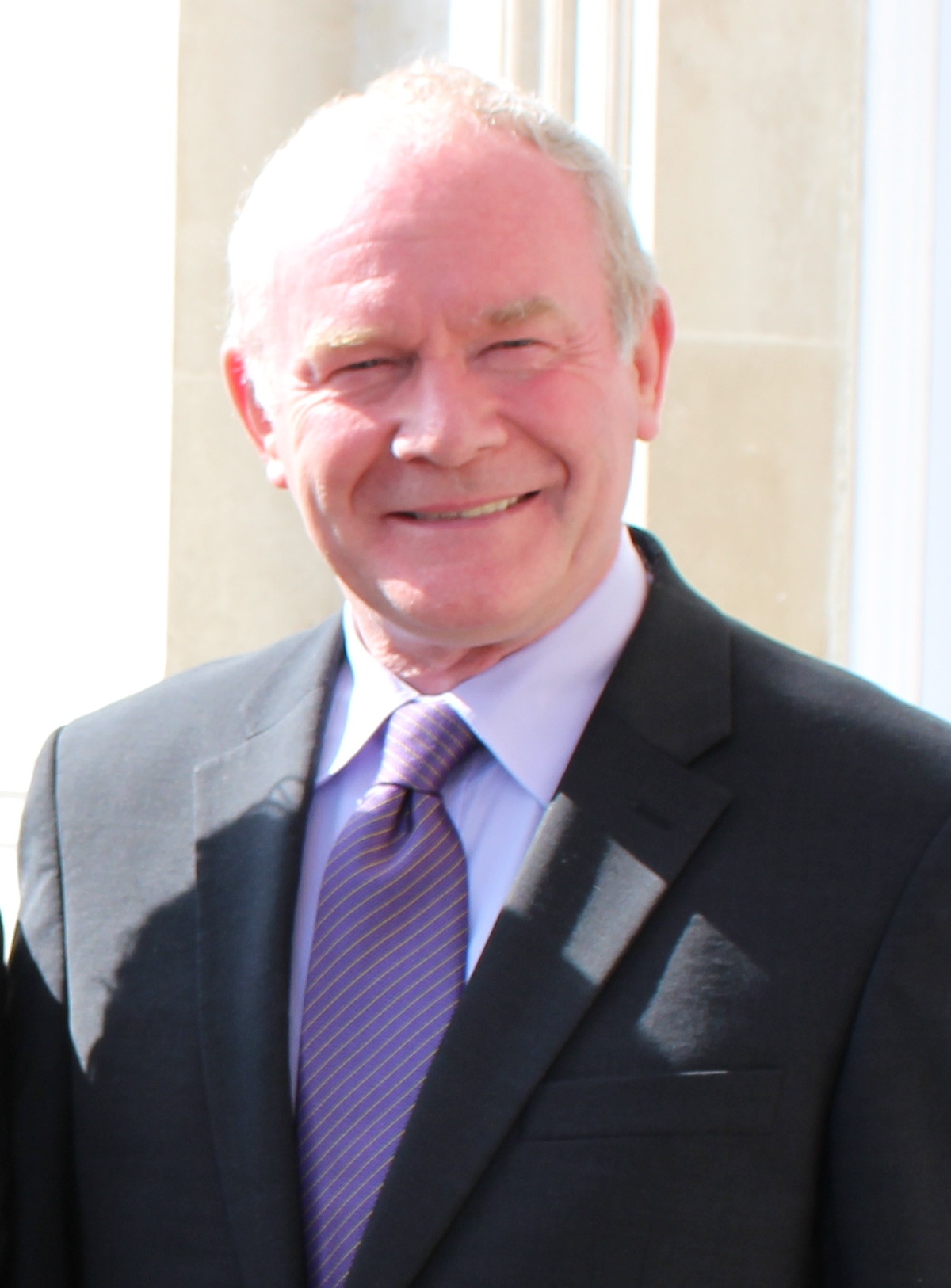
Martin McGuinness

- 8 March – Michael Maher, 87, hurler (Tipperary), long illness.
- 11 March – Danehill Dancer, 24, Irish-bred, British-trained thoroughbred racehorse, old age.
- 13 March – Eamon Casey, 89, Bishop emeritus of Galway and Kilmacduagh.
- 14 March
  - Dara Fitzpatrick, 45, Irish coast guard helicopter pilot, helicopter crash.
  - Mark Duffy, 51, Irish coast guard helicopter pilot, helicopter crash.
  - Paul Ormsby, 50, Irish coast guard helicopter winchman, helicopter crash.
  - Ciarán Smith, 38, Irish coast guard helicopter winchman, helicopter crash.
- 16 March – Roddy Gribbin, 92, Gaelic footballer and manager (Derry).
- 17 March – Maureen Haughey, 91, wife of former Taoiseach Charles Haughey, short illness.
- 19 March – John Rogan, 78, actor.
- 21 March
  - Martin McGuinness, 66, politician, MP (1997–2013), MLA (1998–2017), Deputy First Minister of Northern Ireland (2007–2017), amyloidosis.
  - Mick Butler, 80, hurler (London).
- 28 March – Anthony O'Hara, 61, hurler (Derry), illness.
- 30 March – Tom Savage, 76, communications consultant, short illness.

=== April ===
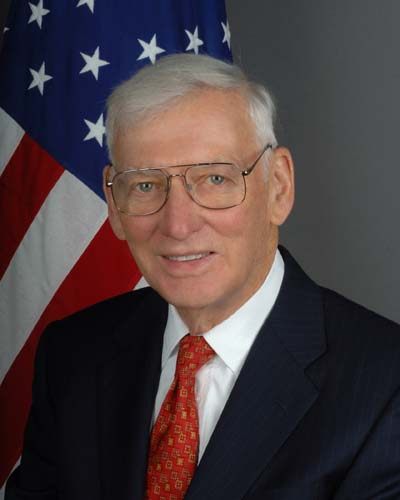
Dan Rooney

- 1 April – Des Kelly, 80, showband singer, long illness.
- 3 April – Denis Mahony, 88, Gaelic footballer (Dublin).
- 6 April – Imperial Commander, 16, racehorse and Cheltenham Gold Cup winner, heart attack.
- 11 April – Micheál Moran, 42, Gaelic footballer (Cork).
- 13 April – Dan Rooney, 84, United States Ambassador to Ireland.
- 15 April – Michael Hayes, 59, President of Mary Immaculate College, short illness.
- 18 April – Patrick Foley, 84, president of the European Golf Association, short illness.
- 19 April – Pat Fitzpatrick, 60, keyboard player, liver cancer.
- 21 April
  - Seán McEniff, 81, businessman and politician, Councillor (1967–2017), long illness following an accident.
  - Cape Cross, 23, racehorse, euthanized.
- 23 April
  - Donnchadh Ó Buachalla, 72, judge.
  - Johnny Roe, 79, Irish champion jockey, short illness.
- 24 April – Donal Toolan, 50, disability rights activist, short illness.
- 27 April – Amberleigh House, 25, racehorse and 2004 Grand National winner, short illness.
- 28 April – Donie Shine, 65, Gaelic football manager (Roscommon).

=== May ===
- 3 May
  - Dick Strang, 77 Gaelic footballer (Tipperary), short illness.
  - Papillon, 26, racehorse and winner of the 2000 Grand National.
- 4 May – Joseph Barnes, 102, physician and tropical medicine lecturer.
- 7 May – Thomas A. White, 85, archbishop.
- 10 May – Eunan Blake, footballer (Finn Harps, Sligo Rovers and Derry City F. C.), short illness.
- 11 May – Kevin Linehan, television producer and RTÉ executive, Alzheimer's disease.
- 12 May
  - Brendan Duddy, 80, businessman and Northern Ireland peace worker.
  - Felicity Fox, 49, businesswoman and estate agent, cancer.
- 14 May – John Devane, 54, prominent Limerick solicitor, long illness.
- 23 May
  - Aidan Gillic, 77, Gaelic football referee (Meath), short illness.
  - Paul O'Byrne, incoming president of Garryowen F.C. and surgeon, short illness.
- 28 May – Hugh McCabe, 62, Gaelic football manager and player, (Fermanagh), cancer.

=== June ===
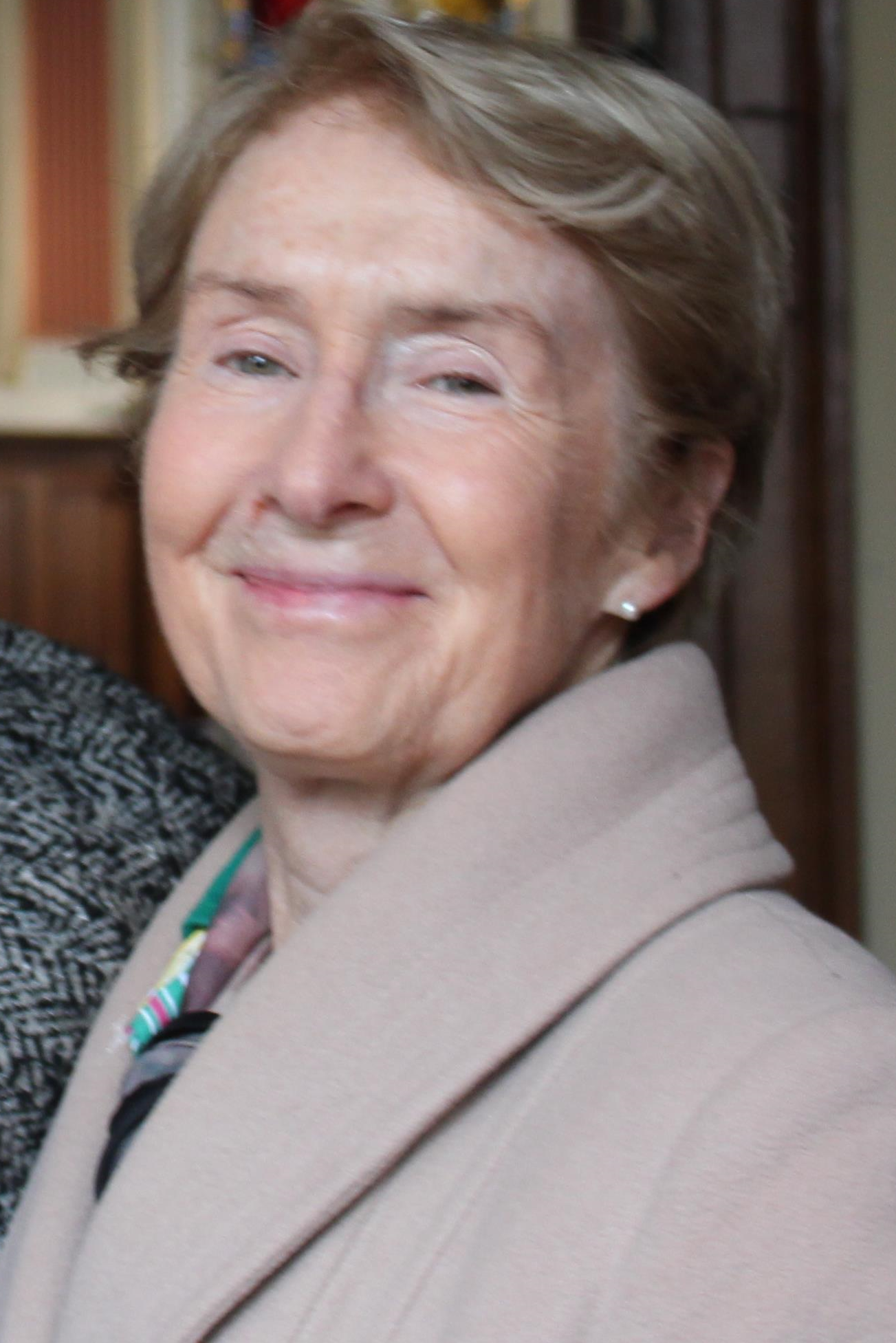
Ann Louise Gilligan

- 2 June – Dominic Earley, 26, Gaelic football coach (Cavan), road traffic accident.
- 4 June – Patrick Johnston, 58, academic and President of Queen's University, Belfast, suddenly.
- 6 June – Georgie Leahy, 78, hurling coach, long illness.
- 7 June
  - Alan Bonner, 33, motorcycle racer, accident.
  - Jack Finucane, 80, humanitarian and co-founder of Concern Worldwide, short illness.
- 10 June
  - Austin Deasy, 80, politician, Senator (1973–1977), TD 1977–2002) and Minister for Agriculture (1982–1987), short illness.
  - Danny Sheehy, 61, poet, boating accident.
- 11 June – Paul Giblin, 34, rower, cancer.
- 12 June – Paul Muldowney, 78, journalist and news editor.
- 14 June – Fred Cogley, 82, sports broadcaster.
- 15 June – Ann Louise Gilligan, 71, university lecturer and theologian, short illness.
- 16 June – Dick Warner, 70, broadcaster and environmentalist.
- 22 June – Des Hanafin, 86, politician, Senator (1969-1993 and 1997–2002).

=== July ===
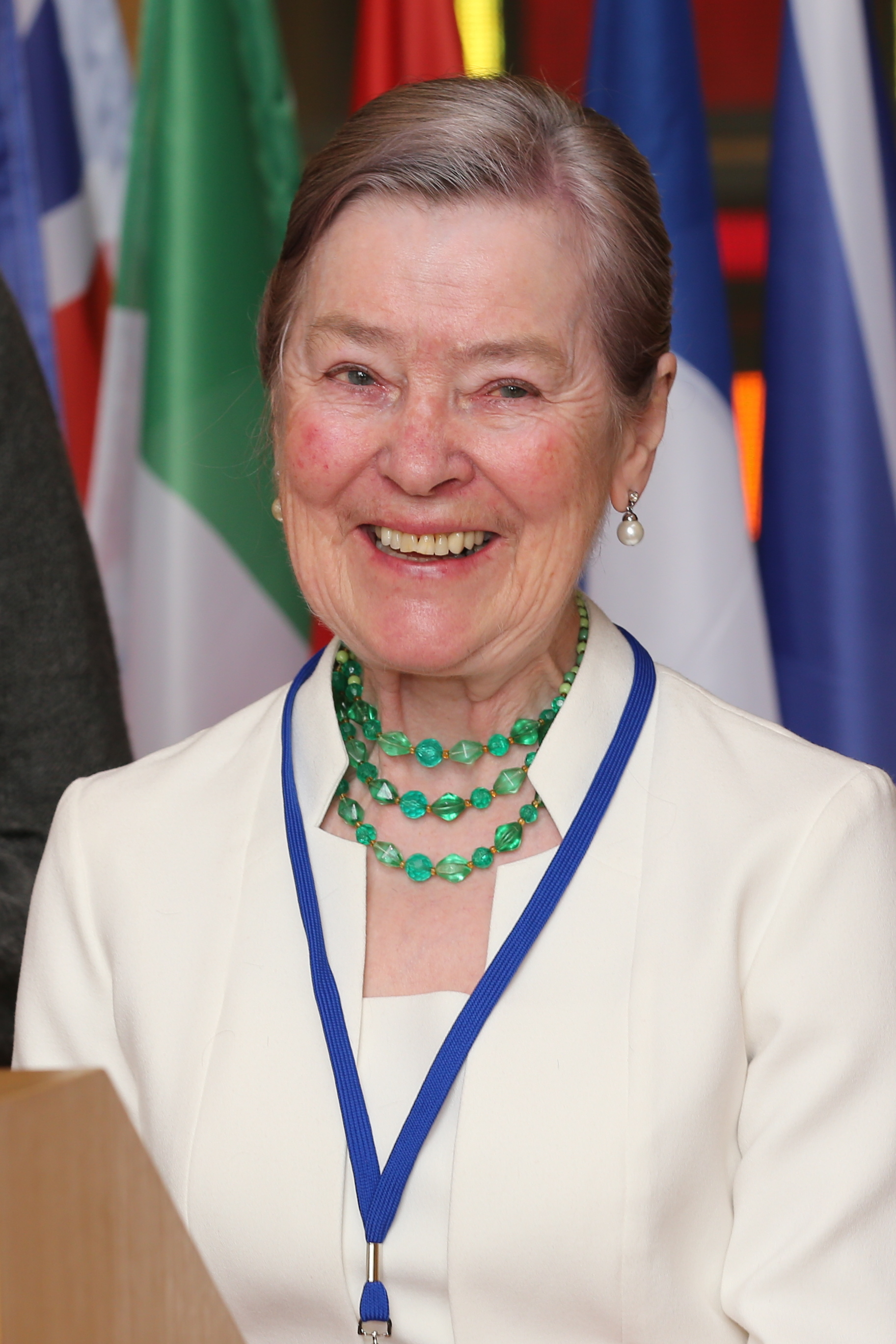
Anne Buttimer

- 1 July – Dave Roche, 50s, gay rights campaigner, heart attack.
- 6 July – Gerry Sullivan, 92, actor (The Riordans and Glenroe).
- 9 July – John McKnight, 86, Gaelic footballer (Armagh).
- 10 July
  - Martin Molony, 91, jockey and horse trainer.
  - Fintan Morris, 51, author and historian.
- 12 July – Tommy Carberry, 75, jockey and horse trainer.
- 15 July – Anne Buttimer, 78, Irish geographer, president of International Geographical Union (2000–2004).
- 19 July – Mary Turner, 79, Irish-born British trade union leader, long illness.
- 27 July – Robert Harris, 75, businessman, short illness.

=== August ===
- 10 August – Tony Keady, 53, hurler (Galway), heart attack.
- 15 August – Liam Devaney, 82, hurler (Tipperary), short illness.
- 16 August – Michael Twomey, 84, actor, best known as one half of the comedy duo Cha and Miah, short illness.
- 17 August – James Osborne, 68, businessman.
- 22 August – Sean O'Callaghan, 62, IRA informer and author, drowning.
- 28 August – Willie Duggan, 67, rugby union player, heart attack.

=== September ===
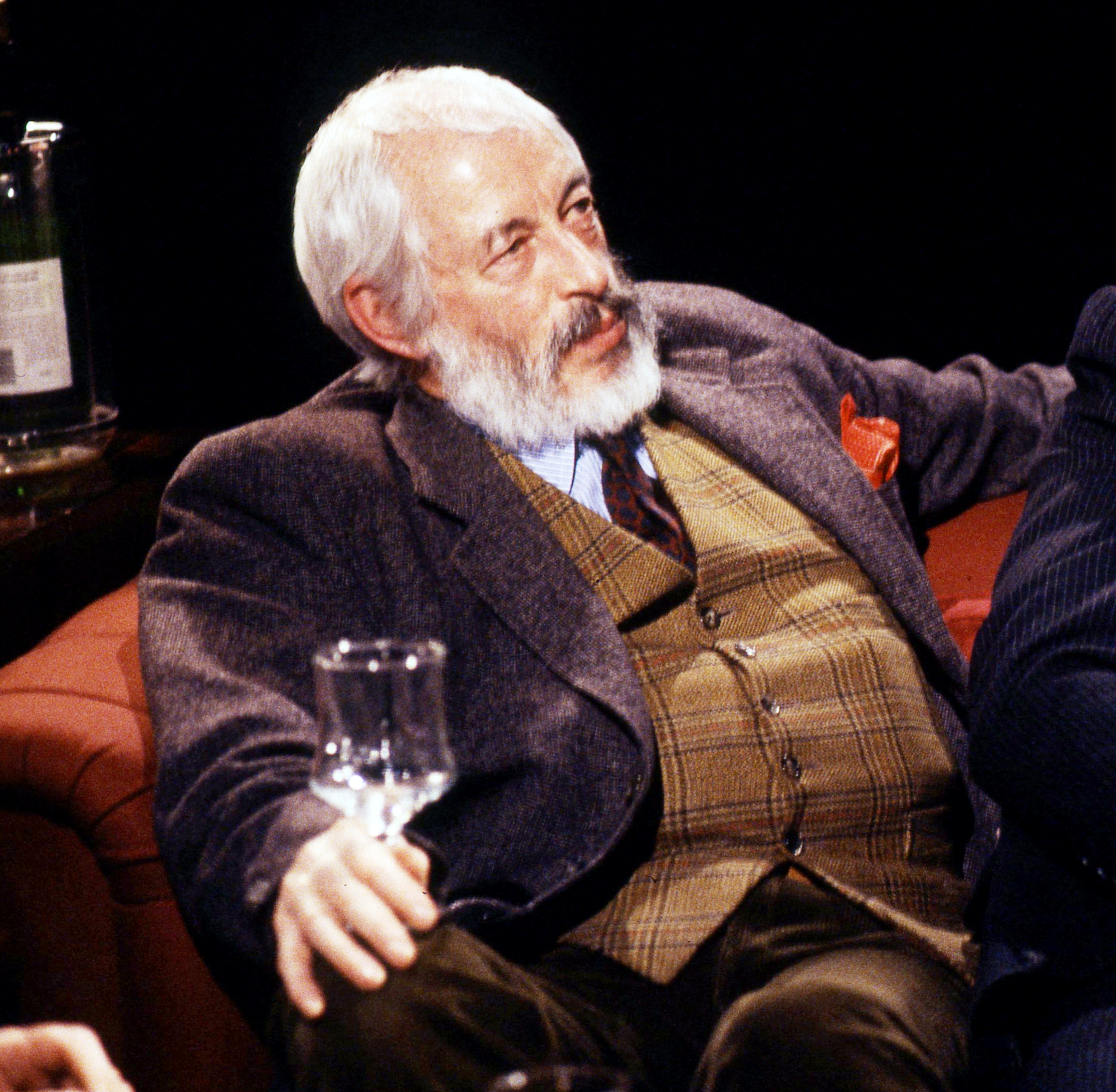
J. P. Donleavy

- 1 September – Peadar Lamb, 87, actor, natural causes.
- 4 September – Don Cockburn, 87, newscaster and broadcaster, short illness.
- 11 September – J. P. Donleavy, 87, novelist and playwright, stroke.
- 16 September – Brendan Reilly, 38, Gaelic footballer (Louth).
- 20 September – Jimmy Magee, 82, sports broadcaster, short illness.
- 26 September – Neville Furlong, 49, rugby player.
- 29 September – Jimmy Walsh, Gaelic footballer (Meath).
- 30 September – Jimmy McDonnell, 90, Gaelic footballer (Louth).

=== October ===
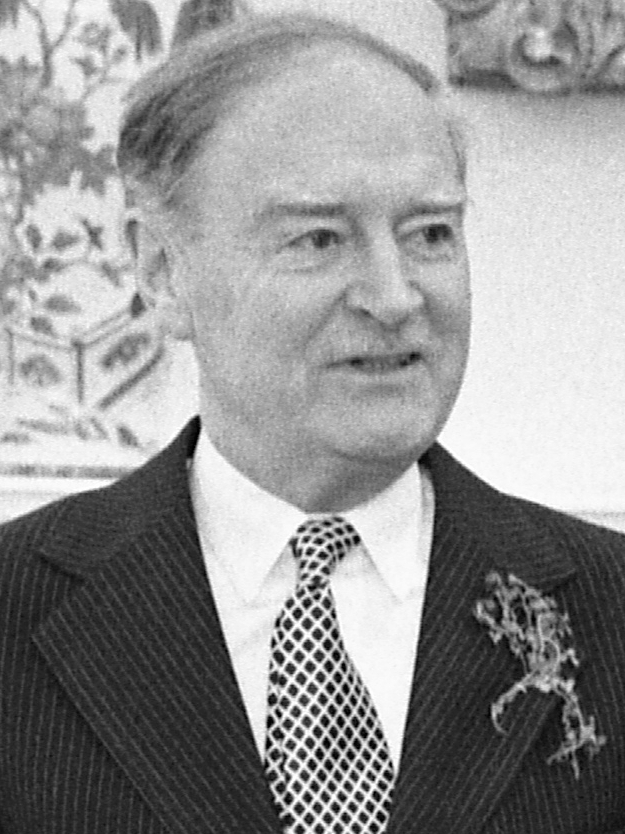
Liam Cosgrave

- 4 October – Liam Cosgrave, 97, politician, TD (1943–1981), Leader of Fine Gael (1965–1977), Taoiseach (1973–77).
- 7 October – Martin Crotty, 71, barrister, sailor and designer, short illness.
- 10 October
  - Jackie O'Hara, Gaelic footballer (Sligo).
  - Neill O'Neill, 36, managing editor (The Mayo News).
- 15 October – Sean Hughes, 51, comedian, writer and actor, cirrhosis of the liver.
- 18 October – Eamonn Campbell, 70, musician (The Dubliners).
- 21 October – Pat Shovelin, 41, Gaelic football coach, cancer.
- 23 October – Joe Corcoran, 77, Gaelic footballer (Mayo).
- 25 October – Fayonagh, 6, racehorse, euthanised following a leg break.
- 26 October – Simon Fitzmaurice, 43, filmmaker, motor neuron disease.
- 29 October – Paddy Devlin, Gaelic football referee.

=== November ===
- 6 November – Scott Fredericks, 74, actor (Doctor Who).
- 9 November – Kevin Dawson, 57, TV producer and journalist, cancer.
- 16 November
  - Ronan Drury, 93, Roman Catholic priest and journalist, illness.
  - Maxie McCann, 83, football player (Shamrock Rovers), illness.
- 21 November – Liam Stirrat, 68, Gaelic footballer, manager and GAA administrator (Monaghan).
- 23 November
  - Frankie Kearney, 77, Gaelic football manager (Derry).
  - Donal Creed, 93, politician, TD (1965–1981), MEP (1973–1977), Minister of State (1981–1986), Alzheimer's disease.
- 25 November – Biddy White Lennon, 71, actress and food writer, short illness.
- 29 November – Willie John Daly, 92, hurler (Cork).

=== December ===
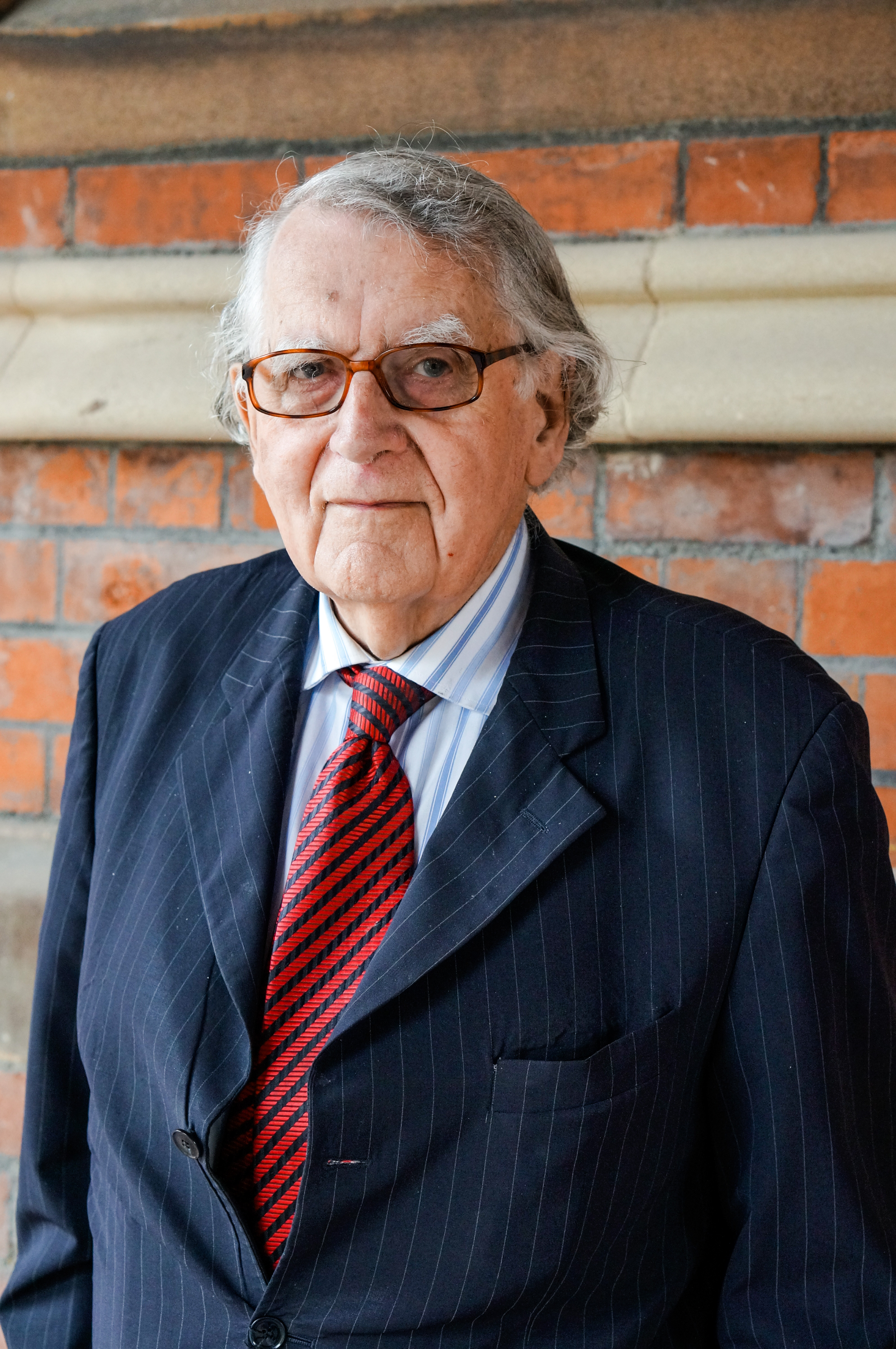
Maurice Hayes

- 3 December – Thomas Finlay, 95, judge and politician, TD (1954–1957), Chief Justice (1985–1994).
- 8 December
  - Robin Waters, 80, professional cricketer and cricket coach
  - Paddy O'Looney, 71, golf tourism chief.
- 10 December – Leo McGinley, 100, Gaelic footballer (Donegal).
- 12 December
  - Izzy Dezu, 16, footballer (Shelbourne F.C.).
  - Pat O'Rawe, politician, MLA for Newry Armagh (2003–2007).
- 13 December – Kathleen O'Connor, 83, Clann na Poblachta TD for Kerry North and the youngest ever woman elected to Dáil Éireann (at a by-election in 1956).
- 19 December – Noel O'Brien, 57, senior National Hunt handicapper, cancer
- 23 December – Maurice Hayes, 90, politician, Senator (1996–2006).
- 28 December – Nichols Canyon, 7, racehorse, euthanized after race fall.
- 29 December – Peggy Cummins, 92, actress (Gun Crazy).
- 30 December
  - Sean McCaffrey, 58, football manager (national team U-17 and U-19), diabetes and kidney disease.
  - Jackie Mooney, 79, footballer (Shamrock Rovers, Athlone Town and Bohemians).
- 31 December – Doreen Keogh, 91, actress (Coronation Street, Father Ted and The Royle Family).

== See also ==
- 2017 in Irish television
