= List of storms named Tia =

The name Tia has been used for two tropical cyclones in the South Pacific Ocean:

- Cyclone Tia (1980) – a Category 2 tropical cyclone that affected Fiji and Tonga.
- Cyclone Tia (1991) – a Category 3 severe tropical cyclone that was the first of six tropical cyclones to affect Vanuatu during the 1991–92 season.

After the 1991–92 season, the name Tia was retired from future usage in the South Pacific Ocean.

== See also ==
- List of storms named Tina – a similar name that also has been used in the South Pacific Ocean and three other tropical cyclone basins
