= List of Irish films of 2014 =

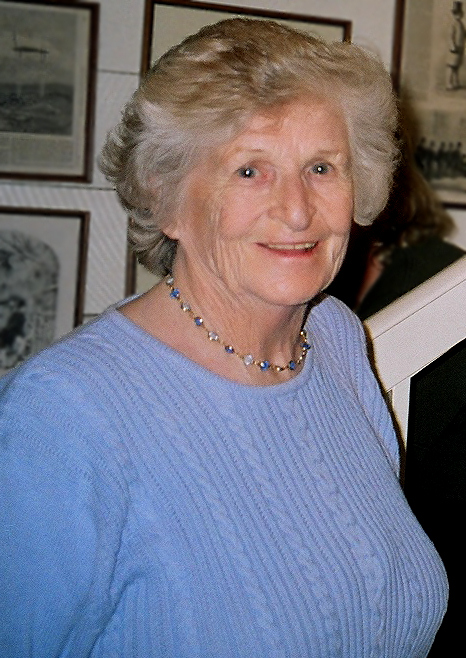
2014 saw the death of Ronnie Masterson.

The Irish film industry produced over forty feature films in 2014. This article fully lists all non-pornographic films, including short films, that had a release date in that year and which were at least partly made by the Republic of Ireland. It does not include films first released in previous years that had release dates in 2014. Nor does it include films made by Northern Ireland, which are included in List of British films of 2014.
Also included is an overview of the major events in Irish film, including film festivals and awards ceremonies, as well as lists of those films that have been particularly well received, both critically and financially.

== Major releases ==
Opening		Title	Cast and Crew	Studio	Genre(s)	Ref.
J A N U A R Y	17	Frank	Director: Lenny Abrahamson; Cast: Domhnall Gleeson, Maggie Gyllenhaal, Scoot McNairy, Michael Fassbender	Magnolia Pictures	Comedy; Drama	
J A N U A R Y	18	Bad Land: Road to Fury	Director: Jake Paltrow; Cast: Nicholas Hoult, Elle Fanning, Michael Shannon, Kodi Smit-McPhee	Screen Media Films	Action; Science Fiction	
J A N U A R Y	19	Calvary	Director: John Michael McDonagh; Cast: Brendan Gleeson, Chris O'Dowd, Kelly Reilly, Aidan Gillen, Dylan Moran, Isaach de Bankolé, M. Emmet Walsh, Marie-Josée Croze, Domhnall Gleeson	Fox Searchlight Pictures	Drama	
A P R I L	17	Let Us Prey	Director: Brian O'Malley; Cast: Liam Cunningham, Pollyanna McIntosh, Bryan Larkin	Kaleidoscope Entertainment	Horror	
A P R I L	18	The Canal	Director: Ivan Kavanagh; Cast: Antonia Campbell-Hughes, Rupert Evans, Steve Oram		Horror	
M A Y	22	Jimmy's Hall	Director: Ken Loach; Cast: Barry Ward, Simone Kirby, Jim Norton	Entertainment One	Drama	
J U N E	5	House of Shadows	Director: Rossella de Venuto; Cast: Fiona Glascott, Pietro Ragusa, Federico Casrtelluccio, Bianca Nappi, Marcello Prayer, Ray Lovelock	Interlinea Films	Thriller	
J U N E	27	Mrs. Brown's Boys D'Movie	Director: Ben Kellett; Cast: Brendan O'Carroll, Jennifer Gibney, Danny O'Carroll, Eilish O'Carroll, Nick Nevern, Paddy Houlihan, Dermot O'Neill	Universal Pictures	Comedy	
J U L Y	11	Glassland	Director: Gerard Barrett; Cast: Jack Reynor, Toni Collette, Will Poulter	Irish Film Board	Drama	
S E P T E M B E R	6	Song of the Sea	Director: Tomm Moore; Cast: David Rawle, Brendan Gleeson, Fionnula Flanagan, Lisa Hannigan, Lucy O'Connell, Jon Kenny, Pat Shortt, Colm Ó Snodaigh, Liam Hourican, Kevin Swierszcz	StudioCanal	Animation; Fantasy	
S E P T E M B E R	7	Miss Julie	Director: Liv Ullmann; Cast: Jessica Chastain, Colin Farrell, Samantha Morton	Columbia TriStar	Drama	
S E P T E M B E R	10	An Bronntanas	Director: Tommy Collins; Cast: Michelle Beamish		Thriller	
O C T O B E R	3	The Quiet Hour	Director: Stéphanie Joalland; Cast: Dakota Blue Richards, Karl Davies, Jack McMullen, Brigitte Millar		Science Fiction	
O C T O B E R	14	The Guarantee	Director: Ian Power; Cast: David Murray, Gary Lydon, Orla Fitzgerald, Morgan C. Jones and Peter Coonan	Irish Film Board	Drama	

== Deaths ==
Month	Date	Name	Age	Nationality	Profession	Notable films
February	10	Ronnie Masterson	87	Irish	Actress	Angela's Ashes; Byzantium
March	8	James Ellis	82	Irish-English	Actor	Where the Bullets Fly; Conspiracy of Silence
June	29	Dermot Healy	66	Irish	Actor	The Butcher Boy; The Guard
August	8	J. J. Murphy	85	Irish	Actor	Angela's Ashes; Dracula Untold
October	19	Gerard Parkes	90	Irish-Canadian	Actor	The Boondock Saints; It Takes Two

== See also ==
- 2014 in film
- 2014 in Ireland
- Cinema of Ireland
- List of Irish submissions for the Academy Award for Best Foreign Language Film
