= October Holiday =

Public holiday in Ireland

- Also called: October Bank Holiday
- Observed by: Republic of Ireland
- Significance: Falls near to Halloween, Samhain and All Saints' Day
- Date: Last Monday in October
- 2025 date: October 27
- 2026 date: October 26
- 2027 date: October 25
- 2028 date: October 30
- Frequency: Annual
- First time: 1977

In Ireland, the October Holiday (sometimes called the October Bank Holiday, Irish: Lá Saoire i Mí Dheireadh Fómhair or Lá Saoire Oíche Shamhna) is observed on the last Monday of October, that is between 25 and 31 October. Usually, but not always, this is the day after the transition from Irish Standard Time (UTC+1) to Irish Winter Time (UTC+0). It was introduced in 1977.

== See also ==
- Bank holiday
