= Cairde =

Irish dance group popularised by TikTok

- Origin: Ireland
- Genres: Irish dance
- Years active: 2020–present
- Members: Brian Culligan; Ethan Quinton; Dara Kelly; Francis Fallon; Stephen McGuinness; Seamus Morrison; Ronan O'Connell
- Website: cairdedancecompany.wixsite.com/cairde

Cairde is an Irish dance group known for their TikTok videos, where they put a modern twist on traditional Irish dancing. The group started actively posting content on TikTok in August 2020, where they began posting Irish dance videos to trending songs on the platform.

Cairde consists of seven Irish dancers from counties Galway, Clare and Cork: Brian Culligan, Ethan Quinton, Dara Kelly, Francis Fallon, Stephen McGuinness, Seamus Morrison and Ronan O'Connell.

== History ==
The dance group began in earnest at the 2017 Fleadh Cheoil in Ennis, County Clare.

On 28 August 2020, the group posted a video dancing to the song "Banjo Beats", becoming viral within a day reaching more than 80 million views and 13.5 million likes.

The group has performed live on many shows. On 18 September 2020, they performed live on RTÉ's The Late Late Show. On Saint Patrick's Day 2021, the group appeared on ABC's Good Morning America and ITV's This Morning, performing live from the Cliffs of Moher. The performances were also projected on the big screens of New York's Times Square.

On 15 June 2021, Cairde put on a special performance for primary school children in Galway.

In February 2022, the group collaborated with Tourism Ireland in France to raise awareness of Ireland, performing at the Eiffel Tower, the Sacré-Cœur Basilica and the Stade de France where 80,000 people attended the Six Nations clash between France and Ireland on 12 February.

On 17 March 2022, Cairde performed for US President Joe Biden at the White House, as part of Washington's St Patrick's Day celebrations, and appeared on Good Morning America.
