= Patrick Heron (author) =

Irish writer

- Born: 2 February 1952; Dublin, Ireland
- Died: 2 January 2014 (aged 61); Dublin, Ireland
- Occupation: Christian author
- Writing career
- Genres: Religion, Christianity

Patrick Heron (2 February 1952 – 2 January 2014) was an Irish author, born and raised in Dublin, Ireland. He became interested in Bible prophecy concerning the "end times" around 1996.

His first book, Apocalypse Soon was published in 1997 and became a bestseller in Ireland. In the About the Author section at the back of the book, Heron stated that he believed God had personally told him that he would be alive at the moment of Jesus' Second Coming.

== Education ==
Heron held a B.Sc. and M.A. in Business Studies from Trinity College, Dublin. He also held a Degree in Theology and received an Honorary Doctorate in Christian Literature from the California Pacific School of Theology, Glendale, California, as a result of the research done in his book, The Nephilim and the Pyramid of the Apocalypse.

== Books ==
- Heron, Patrick (12 March 2007). Apocalypse Soon. Anomalos Publishing. ISBN 978-0-9788453-0-8.
- Heron, Patrick (2 February 2015). The Nephilim and the Pyramid of the Apocalypse. Citadel Press. ISBN 978-0-8065-2810-6.
- Heron, Patrick (2006). The Apocalypse Generation. Patrick Heron Publishing. ISBN 978-0-9553036-0-9.
- The Return of the Nephilim
- Heron, Patrick (15 March 2011). Return of the Antichrist: And the New World Order. Emerald House Group, Inc. ISBN 978-1-935507-48-2.

== Death ==
Heron died from cancer on 2 January 2014.
