= Joe Dooley (St Rynagh's hurler) =

Irish hurler

Personal information
- Native name: Seosamh Ó Dúlaoich (Irish)
- Born: Banagher, County Offaly, Ireland

Sport
- Sport: Hurling
- Position: Right corner-back
Club
- Years: Club
- St Rynagh's
Club titles
- Leinster titles: 2
Inter-county*
Years	County	Apps (scores)
1966-1975	Offaly	10 (0-00)
Inter-county titles
- Leinster titles: 0
- All-Irelands: 0
- NHL: 0
- All Stars: 0
- *Inter County team apps and scores correct as of 19:47, 30 June 2014.

Joe Dooley was an Irish former hurler who played as a right corner-back for the Offaly senior team.

Born in Banagher, County Offaly, Dooley first played competitive hurling in his youth. He was described as being "a teak tough defender, who played most of his hurling in the full back line".

He made his senior debut with Offaly during the 1966-67 National League and immediately became a regular member of the team. During his brief career he experienced little success.

At club level Dooley is a one-time Leinster medallist with St Rynagh's. He won 12 Offaly senior hurling championship medals, between 1965 and 1982. He also won three Leinster Club Championship medals with St Rynagh’s in 1970, 72 and 1982.

Despite being domiciled in Dublin, for a long number of years, he maintained a keen interest in the fortunes of Offaly GAA and was a regular attendee at club and county games.

== Death ==
Dooley died on 28 June 2014.

== Honours ==
St Rynagh's

- Leinster Senior Club Hurling Championship (2): 1972, 1982
