= Cyclone Tini =

2014 European windstorm

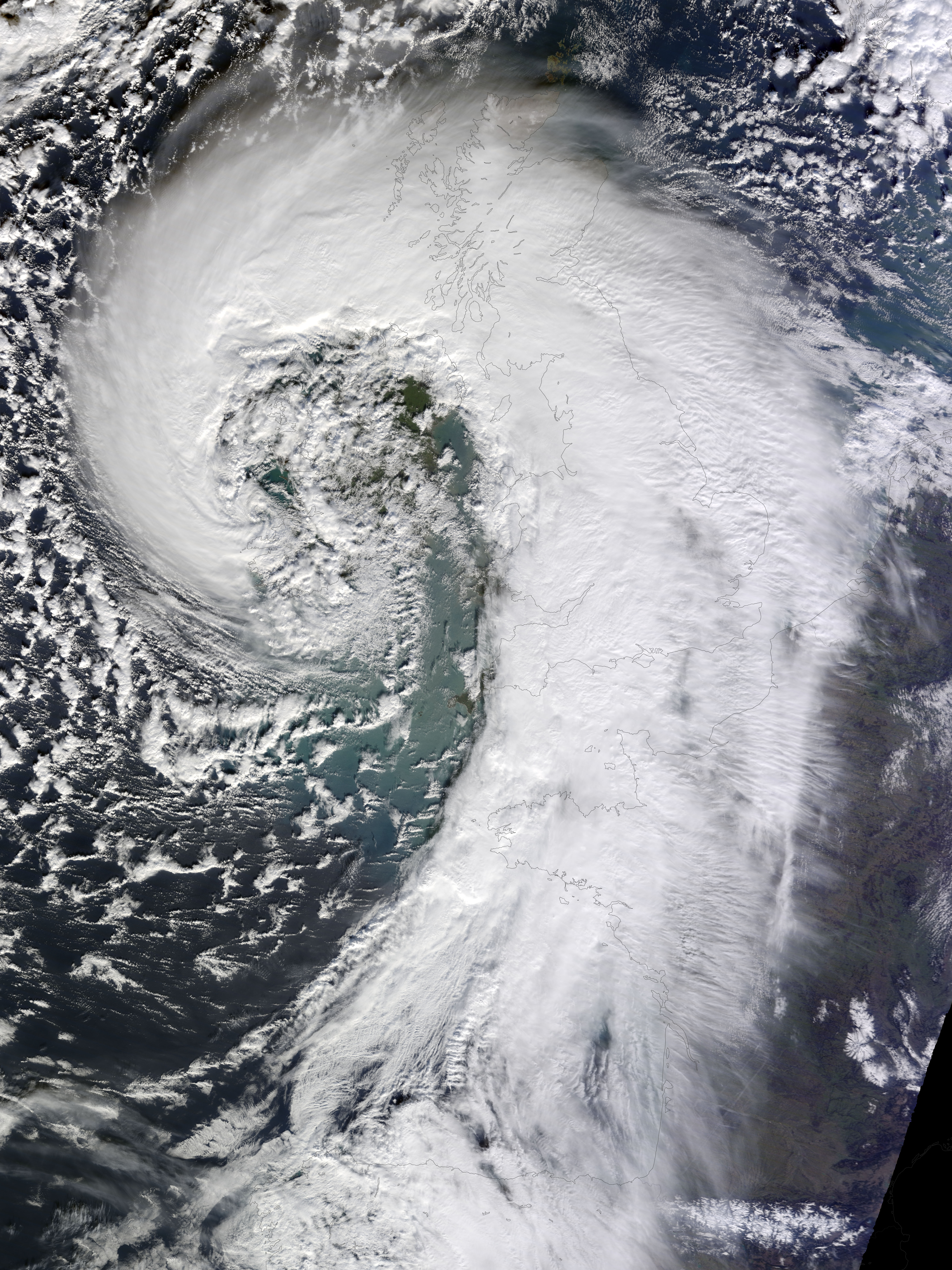
- Storm Darwin

Meteorological history
- Formed: 10 February 2014
- Dissipated: 17 February 2014

European windstorm Extratropical cyclone
- Lowest pressure: 952 hPa (28.1 inHg)

Overall effects
- Fatalities: 1
- Damage: €286 million
- Areas affected: Ireland, United Kingdom, France, Switzerland, Germany

Storm Darwin (also referred to as Cyclone Tini in Ireland) a European windstorm that hit Western Europe, particularly Ireland and the United Kingdom on 12 February 2014. The storm brought hurricane-force winds to Ireland, with the Met Office and Met Éireann describing the storm as one of the most significant to affect Ireland, Wales and West England in recent decades. Tini was one of the strongest storms of the 2013–2014 Atlantic winter storms in Europe, and also brought heavy rain across the UK and Ireland exacerbating the 2013–2014 United Kingdom winter floods, and may have been the most damaging storm of the period.

The arrival of the storm coincided with what would have been Charles Darwin's 205th birthday, earning the storm the name Darwin, particularly in Ireland.

== Meteorological history ==
Synoptic chart of Tini/Darwin storm

Tini/Darwin formed over the eastern USA on 10 February, before undergoing Explosive cyclogenesis as it moved across the Atlantic under the influence of a strong Jet stream during 11 February which stretched from the eastern USA to Central Europe. The storm developed as it moved eastward over the North Atlantic reaching a low pressure nadir of 952 hPa (28.1 inHg) to the west of Slyne Head county Galway.

The storm developed according to the Shapiro-Keyser model, displaying frontal fracture. The storm developed a Sting jet. Tini brought hurricane-force winds to areas of Ireland, Wales and England, and brought some high rainfall totals over the UK and Ireland.

Tini's cyclone centre shifted over Scotland to the North Sea on 13 February, splitting into two as the main area continued to the Norwegian sea where it filled, a secondary low (named Tini II by the Free University of Berlin), developed over northern France. Tini II passed over Brandenburg and Poland into the Baltic Sea before being absorbed by the following area of low pressure (named Ulli) on 15 February before moving across Russia to the Ural Mountains.

The Tini II low reached a nadir of 992 hPa (29.3 inHg) 13 on February over Saxony Anhalt, with peak winds reported in southwest Germany in Baden-Württemberg over exposed mountains and coasts, reaching gust speeds up to 137 km/h (85 mph) at Mindelheim Alpine Lodge. Wind gusts at lower stations reached 113 km/h (70 mph) at Dollenberg in the Black Forest.

=== Historical context ===
Tini was the strongest in a series of stormy low pressure areas which formed in February 2014, following storms (named by the Free University of Berlin) Nadja, Petra, Qumaira, Ruth and Stephanie, and was the last before Ulli, which struck the UK on Valentine's Day. The Tini storm was the strongest of those seen in February, which generally peaked in the mid-Atlantic and brought wet conditions to NW Europe rather than high winds. This period is probably the stormiest in the region since the 1990 Atlantic winter storms in Europe.

Met Éireann considered the Tini/Darwin storm exceptional though not without precedent in Ireland. Met Éireann climate records point to the Tini/Darwin storm as being roughly a 1 in 20-year event although a label of 'worst in living memory' might be applicable in some badly affected areas. Hurricane Debbie of 1961 was more violent in the country (with maximum gusts between 130 and 157 km/h [81 and 98 mph; 70 and 85 kn] generally, with a maximum of 172 km/h [107 mph; 93 kn] reported in northwest Ireland.) Shannon Airport reported a 10-minute mean wind speed of 113 km/h (70 mph; 61 kn) during Tini, the highest value seen since recording at the site began in 1945. More recently the Boxing Day Storm of 26 December 1998 and the Christmas Eve Storm (Yuma) on 24 December 1997 were also of greater intensity in Ireland, with the Tini storm ranking behind these and the Night of the Big Wind of 6–7 January 1839 in Ireland.

Other high impact storms in Ireland include those such as that of the "Ulysses Storm" 26–27 February 1903 and 11–12 January 1974 (where the strongest ever sea level gust in Ireland, at exactly 200 km/h (120 mph), was recorded in Kilkeel, County Down). The UK Met Office described the Tini storm as one of the most significant to affect North Wales and North West England in recent decades.

Tini was the first red "danger to life warning" for wind issued by the Met Office in the UK since January 2012 when Cyclone Ulli affected Scotland.

== Impact ==
Tini's strongest winds occurred across southern Ireland, across the Irish Sea towards Wales and into North West England. Red (Take action) Weather warnings were issued by Met Éireann and by the UK Met Office for "danger to life". The UK Met Office gave out wind warnings of up to 60–70 mph (97–113 km/h) winds for 12 February.

=== Ireland ===
In the Celtic Sea south of Ireland the Kinsale Energy Platform reported sustained winds of 118 km/h (73 mph) and a gust of 96 kn (178 km/h; 110 mph). Sherkin Island, Ireland's second southernmost point reported a gust of 155 km/h (96 mph). Gusts reached 107 km/h (66 mph) at Cork Airport (the strongest recorded at the site in 25 years) which led to the closure of the airport as part of the terminal roof and several gantry signs were damaged. Mace Head had the highest mean 10-minute wind speed and hurricane-force winds (mean 10-minute wind speed of above 119 km/h [74 mph; 64 kn]) also on the 12th with 120 km/h (75 mph; 65 kn), the fifth highest wind speed recorded in Ireland.

Shannon Airport recorded the highest gust of the month on the 12th at 159 km/h (99 mph; 86 kn), the highest for February on record since 1945 and the maximum wind gust since Hurricane Debbie in 1961 at the airport. At Shannon Airport an Aer Arann ATR42-300 EI-BYO was blown onto its wing in 160 km/h (99 mph) gusts. The aircraft suffered damage to it left side. No injuries were reported as the aircraft was empty at the time of the incident. The aircraft has since been written off.

During the passage of the storm there were reports of a tornado in Athleague, County Roscommon. University College Cork was evacuated, and the University of Limerick was placed in lockdown due to flying debris. A major emergency was declared by Kilkenny County Council due to the storm, before being stood down the same day. Strong winds blew the roof off Limerick Boat Club in the city.

On 12 February 2014 the Kinsale Energy Gas Platform recorded a maximum wave height of 25 metres, apart from being a record at that location, it is also the highest maximum wave height recorded in Irish coastal waters (the previous record being 23.44 metres close to the M4 buoy in Donegal Bay off the Northwest coast recorded on 26 February 2014).

The Irish state electricity board, ESB reported 260,000 users were without power at the height of the storm. With a total of 280,000 households (13% of all customers in |Ireland) affected as a result of the storm. The Energy Networks Association, claimed about 80,000 homes and businesses remained without electricity on 12 February 2014. The storm was particularly damaging to the Irish high voltage network, causing faults in 54 high voltage substations (each of which provide supply to 5,000–20,000 homes and businesses). with 25,000 individual faults reported on the power network. This was the second time ESB activated its Emergency Management Plan and Crisis Communications Plan, after 27 December 2013.

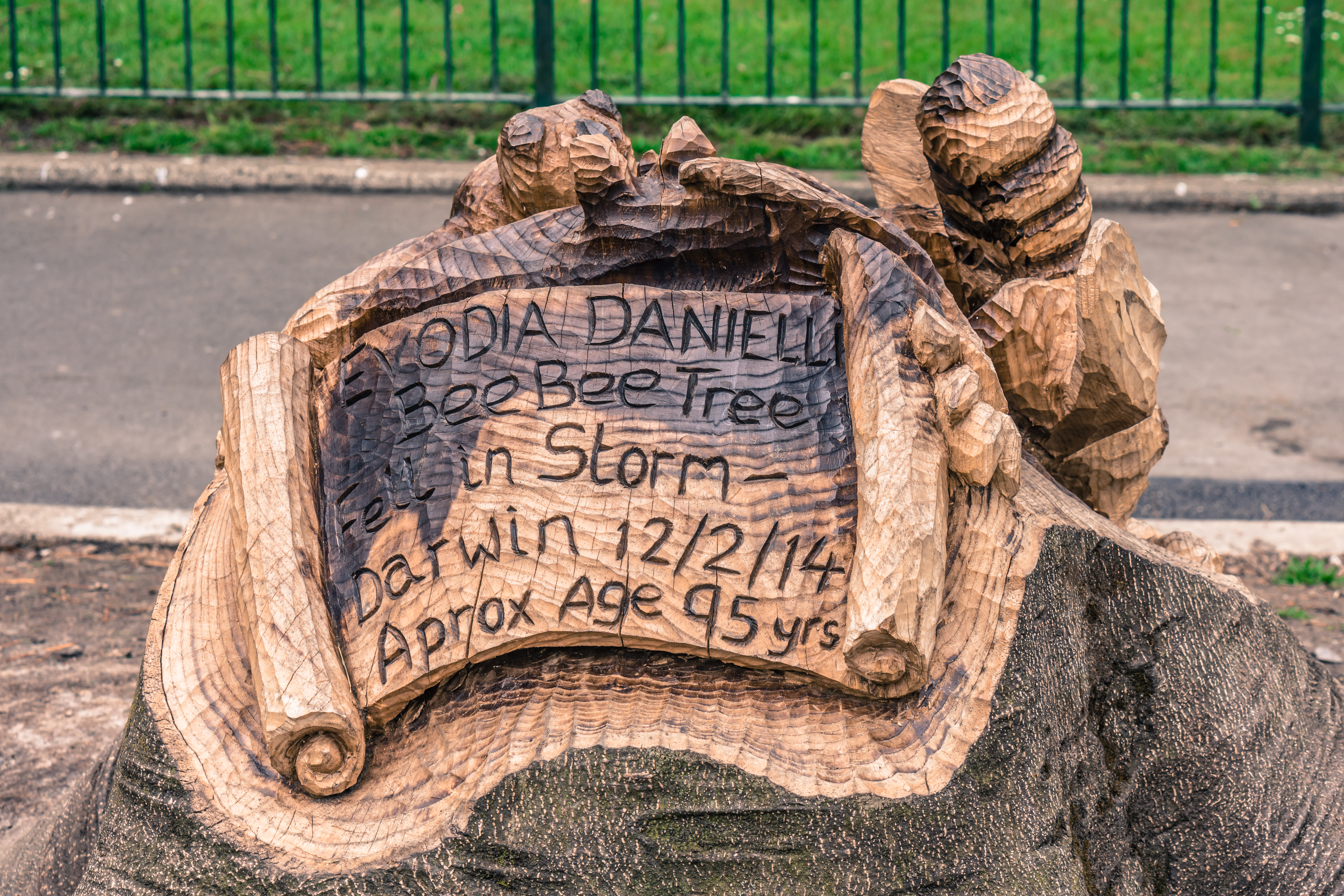
Some of the oldest and rarest trees knocked over in Limerick's People's Park by Storm Darwin have been given a new lease of life by being transformed into works of art.

The storm brought widespread tree falls and road closures around Ireland, with damage to buildings reported across southern Ireland. Cork County Council was criticised for not clearing fallen trees quickly enough and had to call in trained professionals to use chainsaws. Police declared a major emergency in County Kilkenny. Between 5,000 and 7,000 hectares of forest have been blown down, mainly in Munster. Across Ireland an estimated 7.5 million trees in total were blown down. In the early hours of 13 February the Irish contender for European Tree of the Year fell, a 200-year-old Grey Poplar in the grounds of Birr Castle, County Offaly. In February 2014, there was only one recorded death from Cyclone Tini, which was a middle aged man killed when a tree fell onto the car he was driving.

=== Wales ===
Many roads across Wales were closed by falling trees, several railway lines also affected. Anglesey wind turbines burst into flames. Porthmadog railway station part of the roof blown off. Gusts up to 67 mph (108 km/h) in Wales. 52,000 in mid and north Wales, and 23,000 in south Wales without power. 92 mph (148 km/h) gust at exposed coast of the mumbles. A funnel cloud was reported in Llansamlet.

=== England ===
Particularly North West England which saw winds up to 99 mph (160 km/h), with a peak gust of 112 mph (180 km/h) recorded on Great Dun Fell in the Pennines. Led to the closure of the M6, M60, M55 and M62 which saw severe delays due to overturned vehicles and dangerously high winds and trees blown over blocking roads. Across the region widespread structural damage occurred and power supplies to about 20,000 homes were lost. Transport was severely disrupted with flights, trains and ferries all cancelled and delayed. The storm brought disruption to both the West Coast Main Line, which was closed between Preston and Shap, and the East Coast Main Line. Crewe railway station evacuated after winds blew roof panels onto the overhead electricity cables causing fires, the station was closed and 500 passengers evacuated.

There were severe traffic delays in and around Manchester as bridges were closed and fallen trees blocked roads. Railway stations were closed and traffic was delayed or not running leaving hundreds of stranded travellers.

=== Europe ===
The secondary depression Tini II formed over northern France 13 February, with a peak gust 163 km/h (101 mph) recorded at the Phare de Gatteville Normandy, building and forestry damage occurred in Alsace and Champagne Ardennes due to this storm. The highest exposed site in Switzerland at Chasseral in the Jura Mountains saw winds of 154 km/h (96 mph).

UK Met Office maximum hourly gust speed 12 February.
Site	Area	Elevation (m)	Max gust speed (mph)	Max gust speed (km/h)
Aberdaron	Gwynedd	95	108 mph	174 km/h
Mumbles	West Glamorgan	43	96 mph	154 km/h
Needles Old Battery	Isle of Wight	80	96 mph	154 km/h
Lake Vyrnwy	Powys	360	96 mph	154 km/h
Capel Curig	Gwynedd	216	93 mph	150 km/h
High Bradfield	South Yorkshire	345	92 mph	148 km/h
Pembrey Sands	Dyfed	3	89 mph	143 km/h
Aberporth	Dyfed	133	87 mph	140 km/h
Loftus	Cleveland	158	85 mph	137 km/h
Berry Head	Devon	58	85 mph	137 km/h

UK Met Office 24 Hour Rainfall Totals 12 February 2014.
Site	Area	Precipitation (mm)
Shap	Cumbria	46
Bainbridge	North Yorkshire	41
Ballypatrick Forest	Antrim	39
Capel Curig	Gwynedd	37.4
Banagher, Caugh Hill	Londonderry	35.8
Bala	Gwynedd	32
Altnahinch Filters	Antrim	32.4
Keswick	Cumbria	29.4
Pateley Bridge, Ravens Nest	North Yorkshire	27.4
Tredegar, Bryn Bach Park	Gwent	26.8

== Casualties ==
In the UK county of Wiltshire a man believed to be in his 70s died while he was trying to clear a fallen tree which had brought down power cables.

== Aftermath ==
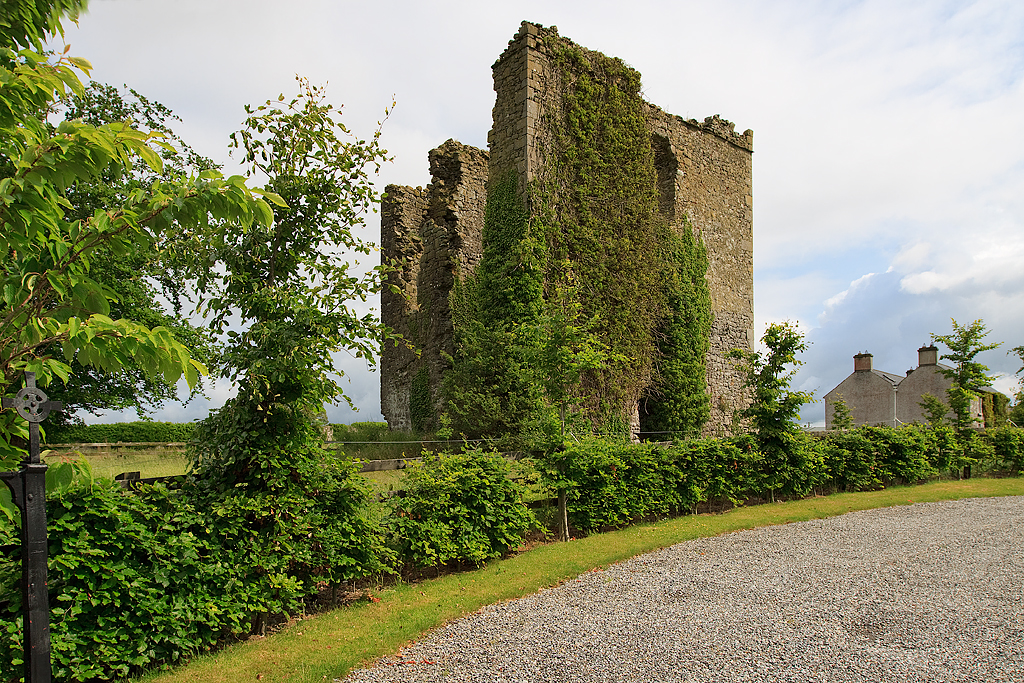
Coolbanagher Castle before it partially collapsed during Tini and its subsequent demolition.

Up to 50,000 homes and businesses in Ireland were without power for a third night as ESB Networks struggled to repair damage caused by Tini. Power had been restored to 200,000 customers but the ESB reported that problems persisted in the south and west. Eircom reported that 65,000 customers were without service following the storm.

Boil water notices were issued in county Limerick and Cork after power outages affected water pumping stations.

The strongest winds hit Wales and Northwest English coasts.

Tini's final loss estimate from Perils was estimated at €286 million.

In the Irish midlands the 13–14 century Coolbanagher castle near Portlaois saw its southern facade collapse during the storm, the remaining structure was later demolished by the owners due to health and safety concerns over the remaining structure.
