= 2019 in Ireland =

- Centuries: 19th; 20th; 21st
- Decades: 1990s; 2000s; 2010s; 2020s
- See also: 2019 in Northern Ireland; Other events of 2019; List of years in Ireland

Events during the year 2019 in Ireland.

== Incumbents ==
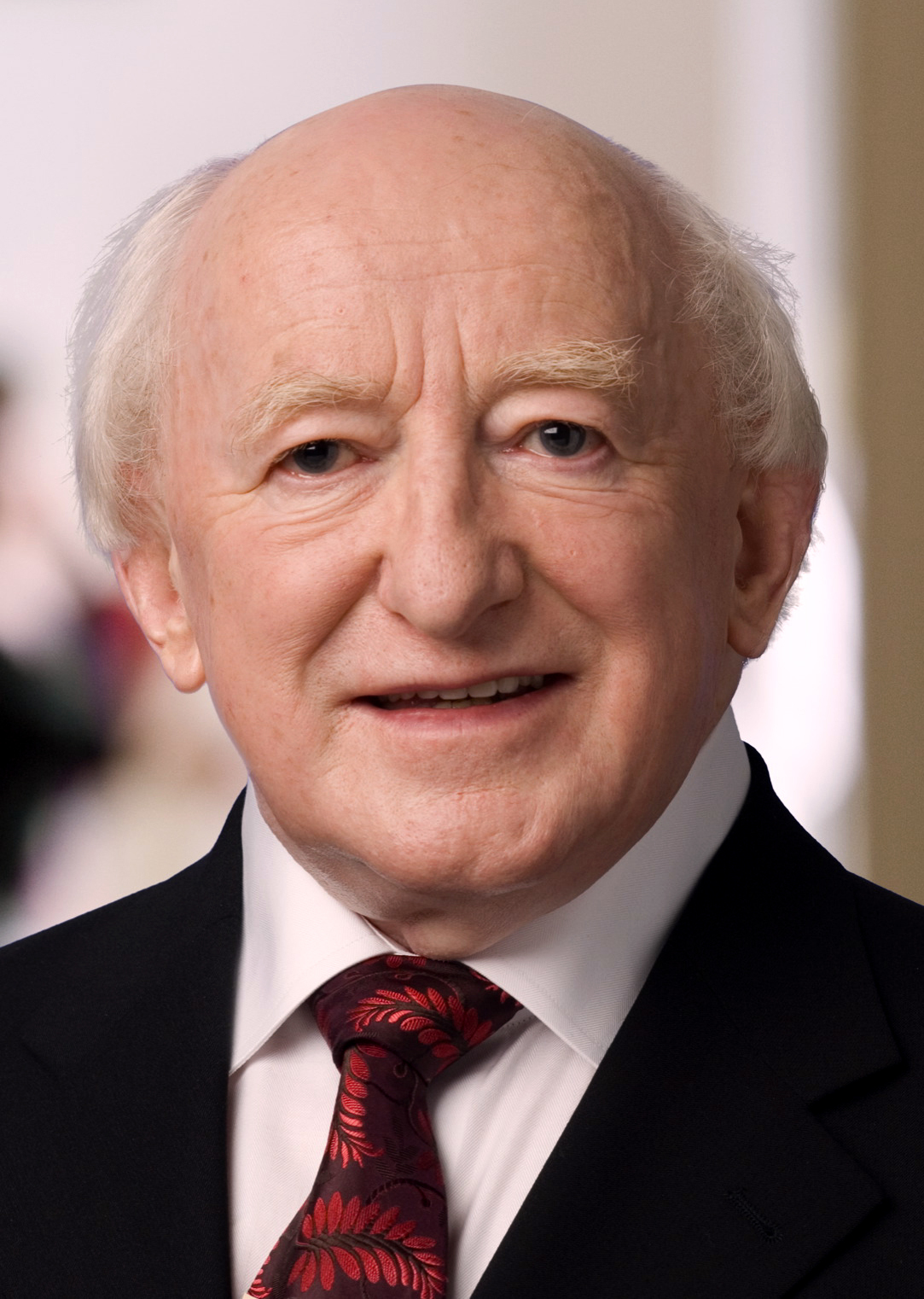
President Michael D. Higgins

- President: Michael D. Higgins
- Taoiseach: Leo Varadkar (FG)
- Tánaiste: Simon Coveney (FG)
- Minister for Finance: Paschal Donohoe (FG)
- Chief Justice: Frank Clarke
- Dáil: 32nd
- Seanad: 25th

== Events ==
=== January ===
- 1 January
  - Abortion services became available in Ireland for the first time under the provisions of the Health (Regulation of Termination of Pregnancy) Act 2018.
  - Technological University Dublin was established by the amalgamation of the Dublin Institute of Technology, the Institute of Technology Tallaght, and the Institute of Technology Blanchardstown.
  - Two fast-food workers were shot by a raider at Edenmore Shopping Centre in Coolock.
  - Library fines were abolished to encourage library usage.
- 2 January – New domestic violence legislation was enacted which included new crimes of coercive control.
- 3 January – Contingency plans for a no-deal Brexit were discussed at the first Cabinet meeting of 2019.
- 4 January – Former senator, James Heffernan, was found guilty of assaulting three gardaí (police) after he was arrested outside the Indiependence Music Festival in August 2016.
- 5 January – Figures from Eurostat showed that the Irish police-to-population ratio was less than the European average with 278 Garda officers per 100,000 of the population.
- 6 January – Garda sources confirmed that a man named as having been captured in Syria by militias fighting against ISIS was a naturalised Irish citizen.
- 7 January – A Garda investigation began after skeletal remains were found by a passerby in a ditch in the townland of Ballyandrew, County Wexford.
- 9 January – The government offered protection to five unaccompanied child migrants who had been seeking refuge in Malta after being rescued from the Mediterranean Sea.
- 10 January – A fire broke out at the Shannon Key West Hotel in Roosky which had been due to open as an accommodation centre for asylum seekers.
- 12 January – One of the most senior figures in the Kinahan organised crime gang was arrested at Birmingham Airport in England in a joint operation between the Gardaí and the National Crime Agency.
- 13 January – The Fianna Fáil party announced plans to reintroduce a bill to the Seanad (Senate) which aimed to protect and give official recognition to the national anthem.
- 15 January – The Supermac's fast food chain won its long-running court case against fast food giant McDonald's to have the use of the Big Mac trademark cancelled.
- 16 January – The minister for finance, Paschal Donohoe, ordered a new economic assessment for the country after a parliamentary defeat for the British government's Brexit withdrawal agreement.
- 17 January
  - Aer Lingus unveiled the new brand livery for its aircraft which included a new shamrock logo, a new typeface, and teal as the main colour on the undercarriage, tail, and engines of its planes.
  - Dáil Éireann was told that a woman carrying a baby diagnosed with a fatal foetal abnormality was not granted a termination at the Coombe Hospital in Dublin.
  - A 22-year-old man died after being shot in the head and chest in a car park outside a gym in Swords in Dublin.
- 19 January – Hundreds of young people attended a protest at the parliament building, Leinster House, calling on the Government to do more to tackle climate change.
- 20 January – A commemoration was held to mark the hundredth anniversary of the Soloheadbeg Ambush, which started the War of Independence.
- 21 January – The centenary of the First Dáil was commemorated with a joint sitting of the Dáil and Seanad in the round room of the Mansion House in Dublin.
- 22 January – European Commission spokesman Margaritis Schinas said Ireland would see a new "hard border" if the UK failed to approve a Brexit withdrawal deal.
- 23 January – Gardaí seized almost €1 million worth of cannabis in Drogheda.
- 24 January – The government published legislation that would underpin Ireland's plan to deal with a no-deal Brexit.
- 25 January – The taoiseach, Leo Varadkar, warned of the prospect of "a police presence, or an army presence" at the Irish border in a worst-case Brexit.
- 26 January – Up to 1,500 people attended a protest on the old Dublin Road near Carrickcaron, County Louth to demonstrate against a hard Brexit.
- 28 January – Former Sinn Féin party teachta dála, Peadar Tóibín, launched a new political party called Aontú.
- 29 January – The Cabinet agreed to hold a referendum which, if passed, would delete a constitutional clause requiring a mandatory period of separation before divorce.
- 30 January – Hospital and community care services were severely disrupted by the first 24-hour nurses' strike in 20 years.

=== February ===
- 1 February – Skeletal remains and a ring fort, believed to date back to the Bronze Age, were discovered on land where former Taoiseach Liam Cosgrave lived in Dublin.
- 2 February – The chairman of the National Children's Hospital Development board Tom Costello resigned following the controversy over the spiralling costs of the project.
- 4 February – The Central Bank announced that €674m was paid by banks in redress, compensation and costs to customers caught up in the tracker mortgage controversy.
- 5 February – Nearly 40,000 nurses and midwives undertook a second day of strike action in an ongoing dispute over pay and retention issues.
- 6 February – European Commission President Jean-Claude Juncker said Ireland will not be left alone and the EU is ready to assist Ireland in the event of a no-deal Brexit.
- 7 February – More than 35,000 nurses took to the picket line for the third time in nine days causing widespread chaos in hospitals and in the community.
- 8 February
  - A 39-year-old man died after being shot a number of times after leaving his home for work in Darndale.
  - The Taoiseach met each of the five main Stormont parties in Belfast before hosting discussions with British Prime Minister Theresa May at Farmleigh.
- 9 February
  - Jón Jónsson disappeared shortly after arriving in Dublin from Iceland.
  - Tens of thousands of people took part in a rally in support of nurses and midwives who are involved in a dispute over pay and staffing levels.
  - The SDLP voted by more than two to one to back a new partnership with Fianna Fáil.
- 10 February
  - The Health Minister Simon Harris and his family were trapped in their home in Greystones where up to 20 people arrived outside, claiming to be "against austerity".
  - It was later announced that Harris will apologise to the Dáil over information he provided on the cost of the new National Children's Hospital.
- 11 February
  - President Higgins began a three-day visit to England, during which he is expected to call for ties between Ireland and the UK to remain strong after Brexit.
  - After discussions at the Labour Court, the INMO and the Psychiatric Nurses Association suspended their proposed three days of industrial action.
- 12 February – Health Minister Simon Harris apologised to the Dáil for not answering questions on the cost of the National Children's Hospital "more fully" last September.
- 13 February
  - Former Taoiseach Bertie Ahern gave evidence to the Committee for Exiting the European Union in Westminster.
  - The Irish Nurses and Midwives Organisation recommended acceptance of the Labour Court recommendations aimed at resolving their dispute over pay and conditions.
- 14 February – A woman in her early 70s died following a collision with a Luas tram in Tallaght.
- 15 February – The fifth plenary session of the All-Island Civic Dialogue on Brexit took place at Dublin Castle.
- 16 February – A controlled explosion was carried out on a hand grenade believed to date from the War of Independence in Lahinch, County Clare.
- 17 February – Ten members of the 'Fingal Battalion' group protested outside the home of Richard Bruton, the Minister for Communications, Climate Action and Environment.
- 18 February – An investigation got under way after a medical centre on the outskirts of Longford town was daubed with anti-abortion graffiti overnight.
- 19 February – An Irish ticket holder won the EuroMillions jackpot worth €175,475,380.
- 20 February – A Sinn Féin-tabled no confidence motion in Health Minister Simon Harris was defeated in a Dáil vote by 58 votes to 53 with 40 abstentions.
- 21 February – All operations at Dublin Airport were suspended for 30 minutes after a pilot spotted a drone over the airfield.
- 22 February – Tánaiste Simon Coveney launched emergency measures to protect Ireland in the event of a "lose, lose, lose" no-deal Brexit.
- 23 February – At the 79th Fianna Fáil Ardfheis, party leader Micheál Martin said that the national interest demanded a general election be avoided because of Brexit.
- 24 February – The Taoisaech attended the inaugural EU-Arab League summit in Sharm El Sheikh.
- 25 February – A search began for the missing head of an 800-year-old Crusader after vandals broke into St. Michan's Church and decapitated his mummified remains.
- 26 February – The Government announced that was to make up to €428 million available to prepare the country for Brexit this year.
- 27 February – Newly released figures revealed that a record number of 9,987 people were homeless in January, including 3,624 children.
- 28 February
  - A 30-year-old Italian man was jailed for 3 1/2 years for the assault of Liverpool fan Seán Cox outside Anfield last April.
  - A security alert was sparked at the Leinster House complex when Fine Gael TD Noel Rock was followed inside and confronted by a protester.

=== March ===
- 1 March – Businessman Denis O'Brien lost his High Court action alleging he was defamed in articles published in the Sunday Business Post.
- 2 March – A protest took place outside Dublin's GPO following a rise in the number of assaults and cases of racial abuse on foreign nationals.
- 3 March – Ulster Council delegate Jarlath Burns said the GAA should not remain neutral if there is to be a referendum on Irish unity after Brexit.
- 4 March – The Department of Health was evacuated after a package containing white powder, later revealed to be baking soda, was sent to Health Minister Simon Harris.
- 5 March – Gardaí began helping an investigation by London Metropolitan Police after three explosive devices, posted in Dublin, were sent to key transport hubs in London.
- 6 March – Transport Minister Shane Ross apologised after referring to Sinn Féin's transport spokeswoman Imelda Munster as a "donkey".
- 7 March – Aer Lingus confirmed that its female cabin crew will no longer be required to wear make-up or skirts as part of new uniform rules.
- 8 March – A former female member of the Irish Defence Forces was detained in Syria over alleged membership of ISIS.
- 9 March – Controlled drugs with an estimated street value of €865,000 were seized by Gardaí in County Meath.
- 10 March – 39-year-old Micheál Ryan was among the 157 people who were on board an Ethiopian Airlines flight which crashed while en route from Addis Ababa to Nairobi.
- 11 March – MMA fighter Conor McGregor was arrested and charged with robbery and criminal damage in Miami after allegedly smashing a fan's phone.
- 12 March – The Irish Aviation Authority suspended the operation of all Boeing 737 MAX aircraft into and out of Irish airspace after two recent accidents involving the aircraft elsewhere in the world.
- 13 March – New research revealed that Dublin entered the top five most expensive locations in Europe for rental accommodation for the first time.
- 14 March
  - Northern Ireland's Public Prosecution Service decided that one former British Army soldier is to be charged with the murder of civilians on Bloody Sunday in January 1972.
  - The Taoiseach met with the US President Donald Trump at the White House where Mr Trump said he was planning to visit Ireland in the year.
- 15 March – Thousands of students took part in school strikes and demonstrations around the country in protest at what they said was Government inaction on climate change.
- 16 March – At least eight people were taken to hospital following a collision between a Luas tram and a double-decker bus at Queen Street in Smithfield, Dublin.
- 17 March
  - Hundreds of thousands of people attended more than 100 parades and festivities in cities, towns and villages across the country to mark St. Patrick's Day.
  - Three teenagers are crushed to death at a St Patrick's Day disco party in a hotel in Cookstown, County Tyrone.
- 18 March – The FAI reiterated that the €100,000 bridging loan they received from chief executive John Delaney "was made in the best interests" of the association.
- 19 March
  - The Taoiseach met with EU Council President Donald Tusk in Dublin ahead of Thursday's EU Council summit regarding the Brexit negotiations.
  - It was announced that Joe Murphy, a hunger striker who died in 1920, was to receive a posthumous service medal in recognition of his role in the fight for independence.
- 20 March – The Cabinet approved a number of issues regarding the introduction of directly elected mayors in Cork, Limerick and Waterford.
- 21 March – The Department of Justice confirmed that a plan to provide an accommodation centre for asylum seekers at a disused hotel in Rooskey will not now go ahead.
- 22 March – The Army's Bomb Squad made safe the viable improvised explosive device recovered from a Limerick An Post office.
- 23 March – Eric Eoin Marques was extradited to the United States over allegations that he conspired to distribute and advertise child abuse images on the dark web.
- 25 March – A young mother died after a freak accident at Cork University Maternity Hospital. Her newborn baby died from injuries almost 36 hours later.
- 26 March – Average noise levels at Dublin Airport are to be kept below 45 decibels after TDs voted in favour of the restrictions.
- 27 March – The Department of Housing, Planning and Local Government announced that the number of homeless people in emergency accommodation exceeded 10,000 for the first time.
- 28 March – The Eurosceptic Irish Freedom Party launched a nationwide billboard campaign calling for the country to leave the European Union.
- 29 March – A father who slapped his two-year-old daughter in a Cork supermarket, causing concerned witnesses to report him to Gardaí, was convicted and fined €700.
- 30 March – Border Communities Against Brexit organised a number of mass demonstrations on the border to mark the day after Brexit had been due to take place.
- 31 March – Minister of State Finian McGrath was criticised for suggesting Gardaí were involved in political policing and had an agenda implementing drink-driving laws.

=== April ===
- 1 April – Tánaiste and Minister for Foreign Affairs Simon Coveney said a no-deal Brexit had shifted from a "remote possibility" to a "real possibility".
- 2 April
  - Facebook Chief Executive Mark Zuckerberg visited the company's international headquarters in Dublin and discussed a range of "policy issues" with a number of TDs.
  - Taoiseach Leo Varadkar met French President Emmanuel Macron for Brexit talks in Paris.
- 3 April – It was announced that turbans and the hijab would be allowed to be worn by Sikh and Muslim members of the Garda Síochána.
- 4 April – German Chancellor Angela Merkel met with the Taoiseach in Dublin to discuss Brexit, and show solidarity with Ireland amid the Brexit negotiations.
- 5 April – An inquest found that a botched IRA warning call contributed to the deaths of 21 people unlawfully killed in the 1974 Birmingham pub bombings.
- 6 April – Irish-trained Tiger Roll won the 2019 Grand National, therefore becoming the tenth horse to win the race more than once.
- 7 April – An earthquake with a magnitude of 2.4 in Killybegs, County Donegal was detected by the Irish National Seismic Network.
- 8 April
  - Sinn Féin leader Mary Lou McDonald accused UK Secretary of State for Northern Ireland Karen Bradley of not having a "deep appreciation" of Irish politics.
  - The European Union's chief Brexit negotiator Michel Barnier said the EU will "stand fully behind Ireland" regardless of what happens in the Brexit negotiations.
- 9 April – Sport Ireland decided to suspend and withhold future funding to the FAI after it emerged the association was to reveal it failed to obey State funding rules.
- 10 April – FAI executive vice-president John Delaney was accused of behaving "disgracefully" by not answering TDs' questions at an Oireachtas committee meeting.
- 11 April – Former INLA member Dessie O'Hare was jailed for seven years for his involvement in a gang which evicted a man and his family from their home.
- 12 April – Ireland's Ambassador to the UK accused the British political magazine The Spectator of making a "hostile" anti-Irish attack which should be consigned to the past.
- 13 April – President Higgins addressed an event to mark the 175th anniversary of the Society of St Vincent de Paul in Ireland.
- 15 April
  - The PSNI announced that a British soldier who shot and killed 15-year-old Daniel Hegarty in Derry in July 1972 is to be charged with murder.
  - John Delaney stepped aside from his role as Executive Vice-President of the FAI pending the completion of an independent review.
- 16 April
  - The Speaker of the US House of Representatives Nancy Pelosi and a team of high-ranking US politicians began a two-day visit to Dublin.
  - The Minister for Transport, Tourism and Sport, Shane Ross, said that the FAI had written to him indicating that the organisation's board will step down.
- 17 April
  - The Speaker of the US House of Representatives Nancy Pelosi hailed the Good Friday Agreement as a "beacon to the world" during her address to Dáil Éireann.
  - Katherine Zappone was criticised for suggesting the people of Tuam knew more about what happened to babies in the mother and baby home than they were sharing.
- 18 April – The 70th anniversary of Ireland becoming a Republic was commemorated.
- 19 April – Politicians and leaders, including the President and Taoiseach, united in their condemnation of the murder of journalist Lyra McKee in Derry.
- 20 April – Saoradh, a far left political party with links to the so-called New IRA, were criticised for holding a march on O'Connell Street.
- 21 April – President Higgins led a military commemoration of the Easter Rising at the GPO on O'Connell Street.
- 22 April
  - Two marches were held in Dublin by the 32 County Sovereignty Movement and Republican Sinn Féin.
  - The Irish Prison Service announced that almost €700,000 was to be spent over the next two years on the electronic tagging of prisoners.
- 23 April – New legislation was published which will allow up to 60,000 parents a year to gain new paid parental leave and benefit from November.
- 24 April
  - Consultants claimed that conditions are so bad at University Hospital Waterford that dead bodies have been left on trolleys, often leaking body fluids on to the floor.
  - The President, the Taoiseach and the British Prime Minister Theresa May attended the funeral of Lyra McKee in Derry.
- 25 April – Three teenagers required medical attention for burns after they were splashed with a corrosive liquid during an altercation in Waterford.
- 26 April
  - A Status Red wind warning for County Clare was issued by Met Éireann in preparation for Storm Hannah.
  - The Taoiseach and the UK Prime Minister confirmed the establishment of talks involving the main political parties in Northern Ireland in an effort to restore power-sharing.
- 27 April – Minister for Health Simon Harris announced that he wants to make children's vaccinations mandatory and has sought legal advice on the matter.
- 28 April – Members the Fingal Battalion Direct Action Group protested outside the home of Minister for Health Simon Harris for a number of hours in Greystones.
- 29 April – An earthquake with a magnitude of 2.1 was recorded about 15 km south east of Donegal and 15 km north east of Ballyshannon.
- 30 April – A memorial to the 49,000 Irishmen who died in Flanders was inaugurated in the Peace Garden in Dublin.

=== May ===
- 1 May – After a 15-week trial and 20 hours of deliberations, a jury found 50-year-old farmer Patrick Quirke guilty of murdering his so-called love rival Bobby Ryan.
- 3 May – Terminally ill Ruth Morrissey was awarded €2.1 million in damages over the misreading of smear tests and the failure to tell her about it.
- 4 May – The taoiseach apologised to anyone who felt he did not treat seriously the concerns raised about mortuary services at University Hospital Waterford.
- 7 May – The Cabinet approved the €3 billion National Broadband Plan (NBP) which aims to bring high-speed internet to more than 540,000 premises across rural Ireland.
- 8 May – A memorandum from the Department of Public Expenditure revealed that it recommended that the government not proceed with the preferred bidder for the National Broadband Plan.
- 9 May – Garda Commissioner Drew Harris said the system to ensure disqualified drivers do not use the roads is "not working" and has created road safety problems.
- 10 May – Ireland became the second country in the world to declare a climate and biodiversity emergency.
- 14 May – Leading National Hunt owner Michael O'Leary announced that he was to phase out his racing team at Gigginstown House Stud over the next "four or five years".
- 16 May – Three members of the Garda Síochána – a superintendent, an inspector and a detective – were arrested for alleged links to an organised crime group in Munster.
- 17 May – Murdered journalist Lyra McKee was posthumously honoured with a special award for outstanding commitment and contribution to journalism.
- 19 May – The son of Sophie Toscan du Plantier appealed for witnesses to come forward and give evidence in the forthcoming trial in France of Ian Bailey.
- 20 May – Britain's Prince Charles and his wife, Camilla, began a two-day visit to Ireland.
- 21 May – A Drinkaware survey revealed that more than one in five Irish adults are classified as a hazardous drinker.
- 22 May – King Carl XVI Gustaf and Queen Silvia of Sweden began a three-day state visit to Ireland.
- 23 May – Gardaí in Drogheda arrested 18 people and seized seven cars as part of an operation targeting feuding gangs in the town.
- 24 May – Elections to the European Parliament, local authorities, and a divorce referendum were held across Ireland.
- 26 May – A referendum on divorce was passed by a large majority with a final result of 82.1 percent voting in favour, and 17.9 percent voting against.
- 27 May – The trial of Ian Bailey for the murder of French woman Sophie Toscan du Plantier in West Cork in 1996 started in Paris.
- 28 May
  - More than 20,000 passengers were affected by delays to rail travel after services in and out of Heuston Station in Dublin were suspended following a major signal fault.
  - The International Astronomical Union adopted the name Eightercua Fossa for a geological feature on Jupiter's moon, Europa. The fossa or trough was named after the Eightercua megalithic tomb near Waterville, County Kerry.
- 29 May – Fine Gael confirmed an internal review would be established to examine the facts surrounding Maria Bailey's civil case that was dropped earlier in the week.
- 30 May – A full election recount was announced in the South constituency (election held on 24 May). The returning officer said it may cost up to €1 million, and could take up to 28 working days.
- 31 May – Ian Bailey was found guilty in absentia by a French court of the murder of Sophie Toscan du Plantier in 1996. Bailey's solicitors described proceedings as a "show trial."

=== June ===
- 1 June – Prominent Donegal county councillor Frank McBrearty Jnr resigned from the Fine Gael party just days after winning them a seat on the local council.
- 5 June – President Trump of the United States and First Lady Melania Trump landed at Shannon Airport to begin their first official visit to Ireland.
- 6 June – Around 2,000 people protested in Dublin city centre against the visit of Donald Trump to Ireland.
- 8 June – Eleven people appeared in court charged with over 200 counts relating to the alleged rape, sexual exploitation and neglect of children.
- 9 June – The Scottish government said Irish vessels could be boarded if they do not stop fishing in the waters around the disputed Rockall island.
- 11 June – The second report of the Scally Inquiry into the CervicalCheck scandal found wider outsourcing of screening tests, with 16 laboratories being used rather than six.
- 12 June
  - A court in Paris, which last week found Ian Bailey guilty of the murder of Sophie Toscan du Plantier, has ordered him to pay €115,000 to reimburse her family.
  - King Willem and Queen Máxima of the Netherlands began a three-day state visit to Ireland, including engagements in Dublin and Cork.
- 15 June – A formal apology was issued to former Garda Majella Moynihan, the woman who was found in breach of discipline after becoming pregnant out of wedlock in 1984.
- 17 June – The Government launched its climate action plan in an effort to "nudge people and businesses to change behaviour" in a bid to tackle climate change.
- 18 June – Two 14-year-old boys were found guilty of the murder of 14-year-old Ana Kriégel in Lucan in May 2018.
- 19 June – Ireland was awarded a road safety prize from the European Transport Safety Council for its "exemplary progress" in reducing road deaths in recent years.
- 20 June – Limerick was awarded the title of European Green Leaf 2020 for smaller cities.
- 21 June – An Post announced that deliveries to the Mac Uilliam Estate in Tallaght have been suspended following ongoing threats to its staff.
- 23 June
  - Ireland's first Ironman Triathlon was held at Youghal, County Cork; however, poor weather conditions forced organisers to cancel the swim on safety grounds.
  - The Donegal International Rally was cancelled when Manus Kelly, who won the event for the last three years, was killed at Fanad Head.
- 24 June – The Fine Gael organisation in Waterford passed a unanimous motion of no confidence in its sitting TD, John Deasy.
- 25 June – The Summer Economic Statement revealed that a no-deal Brexit would leave the Government having to borrow almost €5bn Instead of running a €1.2bn surplus.
- 26 June – Ten thousand HSE support staff at 38 hospitals took part in 24 hours of industrial action over pay.
- 28 June – The Taoiseach attended the 20th anniversary of the British-Irish Council in Manchester.

=== July ===
- 1 July
  - Promising boxer Kevin Sheehy is killed in a hit-and-run incident in Limerick.
  - Edward Crawford presented his credentials to President Higgins to begin his tenure as United States Ambassador to Ireland officially.
- 2 July – Barry's Tea withdrew its local sponsorship of an annual greyhound race following a Prime Time documentary on the sport in Ireland.
- 3 July – The inquest into the death of Denis Donaldson was told that proceedings had been instituted against a person for his murder.
- 4 July
  - The chief executive of the NTMA said that Ireland has a "mountain of debt" that currently stands at €205 billion, some four times higher than it was in the 2000s.
  - Taoiseach Leo Varadkar apologised for his comments to Fianna Fáil leader Micheál Martin where he likened him to a "sinning priest".
- 5 July – A two-year-old girl died in Cork University Hospital after being found seriously injured in an apartment in the city.
- 8 July – The Irish Daily Mail was fined €25,000 for contempt of court arising from an article published during the trial of two teenage boys for the murder of Ana Kriégel.
- 9 July
  - The Taoiseach apologised on behalf of the State to people who were sexually abused in day schools before 1992.
  - A new air traffic surveillance system - which can accurately pinpoint the location of any aircraft in distress - was launched at the IAA's control centre near Shannon.
- 10 July – Hundreds of farmers protested in Dublin to highlight their concerns about farm incomes and oppose the proposed Mercosur trade deal.
- 11 July – A ten-year-old boy died following a drowning incident at a house in Carlingford, County Louth.
- 12 July – Members of the Psychiatric Nurses Association deferred industrial action in a row over pay and working conditions.
- 13 July – A potential data breach at Google was being assessed after reports that their Home smart speaker may have been recording conversations among users.
- 14 July – Events were held around the country to mark the National Day of Commemoration.
- 15 July – The world's first dedicated plastic waste to wax factory opened in County Laois.
- 16 July – Gemma O'Doherty's YouTube account was permanently removed for breaching its policies on hate speech after posting a video which criticised ethnic minorities.
- 17 July – The Minister for Health confirmed the creation of six new regional health boards in the biggest restructuring of the HSE since it was founded 15 years ago.
- 18 July – ISIL bride Lisa Smith said she doesn't think she will ever be going back to Ireland and her decision to move to Islamic State (IS) "wasn't worth it".

- The M11 Enniscorthy bypass was opened to traffic by the Taoiseach

- 19 July – France's Europe Minister Amelie de Montchalin said she had seen at first hand the importance of an ordered Brexit after visiting the Irish border.
- 20 July – Hundreds of protestors marched through the streets of Cork to protest the proposed closure of and the loss of 240 jobs at the Cork Mail Centre in Little Island.
- 21 July – A man was taken to hospital after being struck by a car that drove at a number of persons in a crowded St. Patrick's Cemetery in Dundalk.
- 22 July – An overtime ban involving 6,000 psychiatric nurses was to restart in 48 hours after talks between nurses and health-service management failed to reach an agreement.
- 23 July – Fine Gael TD Maria Bailey was removed as Chairperson of the Joint Oireachtas Committee on Housing over the infamous swing case.
- 24 July – Taoiseach Leo Varadkar said comments made by new British Prime Minister Boris Johnson about the Irish backstop are "not in the real world".
- 25 July – The Gardaí began an investigation into the standard of care at Hyde & Seek creches after an RTÉ documentary revealed how children were roughly handled.
- 26 July – The Tánaiste described Boris Johnson's approach to Brexit as "unhelpful" after a meeting with new Northern Ireland Secretary Julian Smith in Belfast.
- 27 July – Sinn Féin leader Mary Lou McDonald said an all-Ireland forum on Irish unity should be convened without delay.
- 29 July – 18-year-old Fionn Ferreira, from Ballydehob, was named the Grand Prize winner at the 2019 Google Science Fair.
- 30 July – Taoiseach Leo Varadkar and British Prime Minister Boris Johnson spoke by telephone for the first time since Mr Johnson took office almost a week ago.
- 31 July – The Central Bank warned that a no-deal Brexit would lead to a dramatic Irish economic slowdown and result in 34,000 fewer jobs.

=== August ===
- 3 August – Taoiseach Leo Varadkar took part in Belfast's pride parade for the first time.
- 6 August – The number of women identified as part of the CervicalCheck IT problem was revealed to be over 4,000, according to a Rapid Review report.
- 18 August – Tipperary won the All Ireland Hurling final against Kilkenny.
- 26 August – New figures revealed that over 1,600 cars had been impounded from unaccompanied learner drivers since new legislation was introduced in December.
- 26 August – Vincent Parsons, a builder from Clondalkin, died after an assault two days before.
- 29 August – The Sinn Féin party was left a £1.5 million (€1.66m) donation in the will of London-born party supporter, William E. Hampton.
- 30 August – Beef farmers protesting at the ABP meat-processing plant in Bandon agreed a "one-day" deal to allow a Chinese delegation to visit the facility.

=== September ===
- 1 September – The Catholic Church claimed for the first time that a pilgrim experienced a "miraculous cure" in Knock.
- 2 September – Thomas Kavanagh, a senior figure in the Kinahan organised crime gang, was jailed in the UK for three years for possessing a disguised firearm.
- 3 September – US Vice-President Mike Pence met with the Taoiseach and President Higgins at the start of his visit to Ireland.
- 4 September – The EU's chief Brexit negotiator, Michel Barnier, pulled out of a planned visit to Northern Ireland.
- 5 September – The World Health Organization revealed that Ireland has one of the highest levels of alcohol consumption and heavy drinking in Europe,
- 6 September – Aontú leader Peadar Tóibín said if his party's candidates are electorally successful in Northern Ireland, they will not take their seats in the British Parliament.
- 7 September – Over 180,000 cigarettes were seized after an Italian-registered merchant vessel was detained off the coast of Dublin by revenue officers.
- 8 September – Labour Party leader Brendan Howlin accused the Government of being far too passive in its planning for a no-deal Brexit.
- 9 September
  - The Taoiseach and the British Prime Minister held their first face-to-face meeting to discuss Brexit since Boris Johnson took over at Number 10.
  - It was announced that Ireland's EU Commissioner Phil Hogan will be appointed the EU's chief trade negotiator.
- 10 September – Up to 3,000 workers have been laid off at meat processing plants amid the ongoing dispute over beef prices, according to Meat Industry Ireland.
- 11 September – Minister for Finance Paschal Donohoe ruled out any reductions in personal taxation in the next Budget.
- 12 September
  - Taoiseach Leo Varadkar said that May 2020 would be the "right moment" for a general election.
  - President Higgins said members of the Defence Forces should have incomes that are sufficient to provide for themselves and their families.
  - Independent TD Noel Grealish was criticised for comments he reportedly made at a public meeting in which he described African economic migrants as "spongers".
- 13 September – The Taoiseach conceded that his party would be willing to support a Fianna Fáil-led Government under a new confidence and supply agreement.
- 14 September – It was revealed that the Taoiseach decided not to remove the Fine Gael party whip from 'swing-gate' TD Maria Bailey following appeals from the Tánaiste.
- 15 September – An agreement was reached between beef farmers and meat processors after 36 hours of talks organised by the Minister for Agriculture Michael Creed.
- 16 September – Researchers at NUI Galway made aviation history by using drone technology to deliver diabetes medication to the Aran Islands.
- 17 September – A former IRA member alleged that Gerry Adams "lied" by claiming he was never a member of the IRA.
- 18 September – Kevin Lunney, a director of Quinn Industrial Holdings was left with a broken leg after he was abducted near his Fermanagh home and assaulted.
- 19 September – Processing resumed at Slaney Meats, one of the meat plants that was at the centre of a month-long beef protest blockade.
- 20 September
  - Thousands of Irish students took part in what was described as the largest global climate protest in history.
  - The Museum of Literature Ireland (MoLI) opened in Dublin.
- 21 September – The Irish Hospital Consultants' Association revealed that a million people are on waiting lists for acute hospital appointments.
- 22 September – The last remaining beef protest blockade was stood down as farmers who had been blockading the Liffey Meats plant in Ballinasloe voted to end their action.
- 23 September – The Taoiseach told the United Nations Climate Action Summit in New York that the Government was planning to phase out oil exploration in 80% Irish waters.
- 24 September – The Taoiseach and the British Prime Minister held Brexit talks on the margins of the United Nations General Assembly.
- 25 September – Fianna Fáil leader Micheál Martin called for the establishment of a cross-border multi-disciplinary agency to tackle criminal activity in the border region.
- 27 September – The Finance Minister ruled out a supplementary budget in the event of a no-deal Brexit.
- 28 September – John Delaney resigned from his position of Executive Vice President of the Football Association of Ireland with immediate effect.
- 29 September – Gardaí recovered a very valuable 17th Century chalice that was stolen during a burglary in Ardee in 1998.
- 30 September – The UK proposed the creation of a string of customs posts along both sides of the Irish border as part of its effort to replace the backstop.

=== October ===
- 1 October
  - The Taoiseach insisted the British government should not "impose" customs checks "against the will of the people" north and south of the border.
  - The developer of a hotel in Oughterard which was earmarked to open as a direct provision centre withdrew his tender and would not be proceeding with the development.
- 2 October – A whale, estimated to be 20 feet in length, was spotted in the River Liffey near the opening to Dublin Bay.
- 3 October – The full force of Storm Lorenzo was felt along the west and south west coasts over night with high winds, torrential rain and heavy seas.
- 4 October – Bailout funds amounting to some €450m to plug overspending in departments, most of which is in Health, were agreed by the Government.
- 5 October – A number of workers were brought to hospital after a chemical leak in West Dublin.
- 6 October – Two men were killed in a light aircraft crash in County Wexford.
- 7 October – A number of road blocks were mounted by climate change activists in a Dublin city centre demonstration as part of the Extinction Rebellion campaign.
- 8 October – Minister for Finance Paschal Donohoe announced his budget which included a €6 increase in the carbon tax.
- 9 October – Fossilised bones from an amphibian-like creature that lived on the west coast 325 million years ago were found near Doolin.
- 10 October – The Taoiseach said a Brexit deal by the 31 October deadline was possible following talks with British Prime Minister Boris Johnson in Liverpool.
- 11 October – Fianna Fáil leader Micheál Martin ruled out an autumn snap general election if a successful EU-UK deal is negotiated before the Brexit Halloween deadline.
- 13 October – The founding rector of Ireland's only Catholic university, precursor of University College Dublin, John Henry Newman was canonised by Pope Francis.
- 28 October – Sinn Féin TD Martin Kenny's car was set ablaze outside his family home after he spoke out against anti-immigrant elements in Irish society.

=== November ===
- 5 November – Two teenage boys received respective sentences of life and 15 years for the murder of 14-year-old Ana Kriégel last year.
- 12 November
  - A new law came into effect making the reckless overtaking of cyclists illegal, punishable by a fine of €120 and a minimum of three penalty points.
  - The Immigrant Council said comments by Independent TD Noel Grealish that €10 billion had been sent abroad over the last eight years are "shameful" and "racist".
- 14 November – Controversial Fine Gael TD Maria Bailey was deselected as a candidate for the Dún Laoghaire constituency for the next general election.
- 18 November – The remains of murdered Irish gangster Wayne Whelan were discovered in the passenger seat of a burning car in Lucan, Dublin.
- 23 November – A Protest Rally was held in Roscommon town against the proposed closure of a respite Holiday Centre in the county.
- 26 November – Four men appeared in court charged with assault and false imprisonment of Quinn Industrial Holdings director Kevin Lunney.
- 28 November- It is revealed that the cost of the new Dáil printer for the Houses of the Oireachtas cost €1.6 million Euros
- 29 November – By-elections were held in Dublin Mid-West, Cork North-Central, Dublin Fingal and Wexford to replace outgoing TDs.
- 30 November – Fine Gael TD Dara Murphy said he had been compliant "at all times" with Leinster House rules following criticism over his Dáil attendance.

=== December ===
- 1 December
  - Dublin received its first dedicated 24-hour bus services, with the launch of Dublin Bus routes 15 and 41. The forthcoming BusConnects project promises more.
  - Former member of the Defence Forces Lisa Smith was arrested on suspicion of terrorist offences after arriving at Dublin Airport on a flight from Turkey.
- 2 December – A new €22m white-water rafting facility in George's Dock was approved by Dublin City Council.
- 3 December – The Government survived a motion of no confidence in Minister for Housing, Planning and Local Government Eoghan Murphy by three votes.
- 4 December
  - Fine Gael's Dara Murphy resigned his seat as TD for Cork North-Central to take up a new role in the European Commission.
  - Former Defence Forces member Lisa Smith appeared in court in Dublin charged with committing a terrorist offence between October 2015 and December 2019.
  - Gardaí launched an investigation after eight migrants were discovered hiding aboard a bulk cargo ship by crew in Waterford.
- 5 December – Farmers mounted a 12-hour blockade of Aldi in Naas in protest over beef prices.
- 6 December – The publication of the Football Association of Ireland's accounts revealed liabilities of €55m.
- 7 December – The Taoiseach said imposing restrictions on TDs and senators from double-jobbing would "need consideration".
- 8 December – Storm Atiyah made landfall in Ireland bringing high winds and rough seas as it tracked eastwards across the country.
- 9 December – Kerry TD Michael Healy-Rae was treated for smoke inhalation after a fire broke out in his office/shop.
- 10 December – A recently discovered painting by the Jack Butler Yeats, which lay hidden in a bank vault for 52 years, sold for more than triple its guide price.
- 11 December – The Minister for Children and Youth Affaird announced that adopted people will not be given automatic access to their birth records under planned changes to legislation.
- 12 December – The Irish harp was inscribed on the UNESCO list of Intangible Cultural Heritage.
- 13 December – It was reported that Ireland had been granted an enhanced role in how the Brexit agreement will be implemented.
- 14 December – The Taoiseach said an independent person may be appointed to examine the Dáil attendance record and expenses claims of former TD Dara Murphy.
- 15 December – It was revealed that Fianna Fáil leader Micheál Martin had written to the Taoiseach seeking agreement on a date for the next general election.
- 16 December – The High Court endorsed a European Arrest Warrant issued by the French Authorities who are seeking the extradition of Ian Bailey.
- 17 December – The Minister for Justice announced that Ireland is to accept up to 2,900 refugees over the next four years through resettlement and community sponsorship.
- 18 December – The Fine Gael Executive Council decided to deselect Verona Murphy as a candidate for the Wexford constituency for the next general election.
- 19 December – Three men charged with false imprisonment and attacking Quinn Industrial Holdings (QIH) director Kevin Lunney were denied bail in the High Court.
- 22 December – Tesco Ireland withdrew Christmas cards from sale that were manufactured in a Chinese factory that is alleged to have used "forced labour".
- 23 December
  - The High Court rejected Ryanair's attempt to prevent operations chief Peter Bellew from joining rival EasyJet until 2021.
  - The Taoiseach wrote to Fianna Fáil leader Micheál Martin to say the two men should meet in the first days of 2020 to discuss an agreed general election date.
- 28 December – Two people who were kayaking on Lough Derg near Garrykennedy were rescued by the RNLI after getting into difficulty.
- 29 December – The Football Association of Ireland board apologised to those involved in Irish football, the public and its staff for "mistakes of the past".

== Arts ==
- 8 January – The Arts Council withheld €300,000 in funding from the Abbey Theatre, pending confirmation of employment opportunities for Irish-based artists.
- 18 January – The Cranberries band members were made Honorary Doctors of Letters at a special ceremony at the University of Limerick.
- 31 January – Radio station RTÉ 2fm was renamed Larry Gogan FM for the day in honour of the DJ who retired after 40 years with the station.
- 31 May – Radio station RTÉ 2fm celebrated its 40th anniversary.
- 20 September – Museum of Literature Ireland (MoLI) opened in Dublin.
- 26 November – It was announced that the David Cohen Prize for literature was being awarded to Edna O'Brien for her lifetime achievement.

== Deaths ==
=== January ===
- 2 January
  - Peter Kelly, 74, politician, TD (2002–2011), cancer.
  - Joe McCabe, 99, hurler (Clonad, Laois).
- 4 January – John Nallen, 86, Gaelic footballer (Tuam Stars, Mayo, Galway).
- 7 January – Jim Horgan, 63, sports reporter and radio journalist (Cork's 96FM).
- 16 January – Alan McQuillan, 37, radio presenter and producer (RTÉ 2fm).
- 19 January – Emma Church, 54, CervicalCheck scandal campaigner, cervical cancer.
- 21 January – Padraic Fiacc, 94, poet.

=== February ===
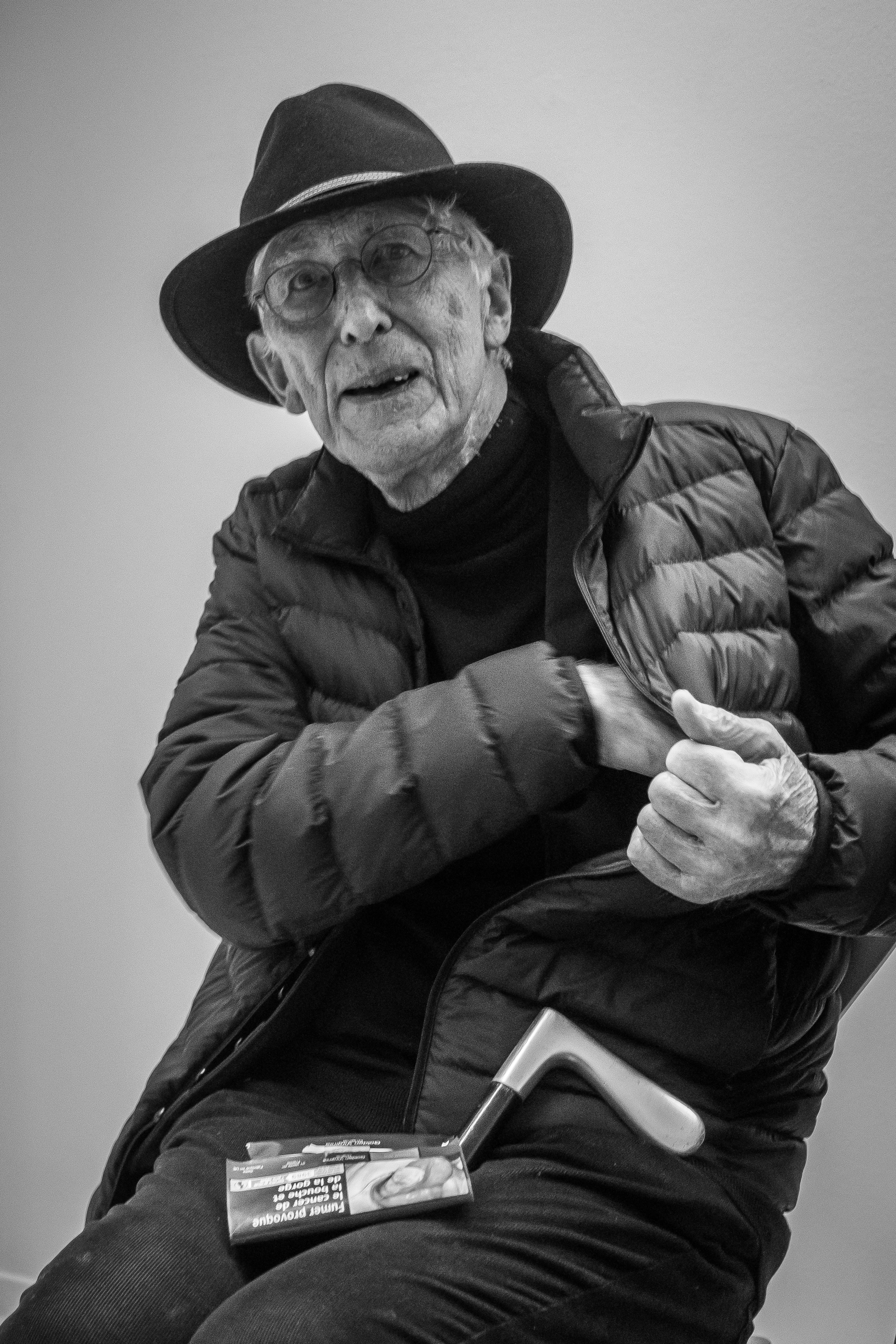
Tomi Ungerer

- 7 February
  - Arthur Murphy, 90, singer and broadcaster.
  - Noel Reid, 80, racing journalist and broadcaster.
- 8 February – Frankie Byrne, 94, Gaelic footballer (Meath).
- 9 February
  - Mick Kennedy, 57, footballer (Portsmouth, Stoke City, national team).
  - Tomi Ungerer, 87, French-born author and illustrator.
- 11 February – Nora Bennis, 78, political activist and pro-life campaigner.
- 28 February – Noel Mulcahy, 88, politician, Senator (1977–1981).

=== March ===
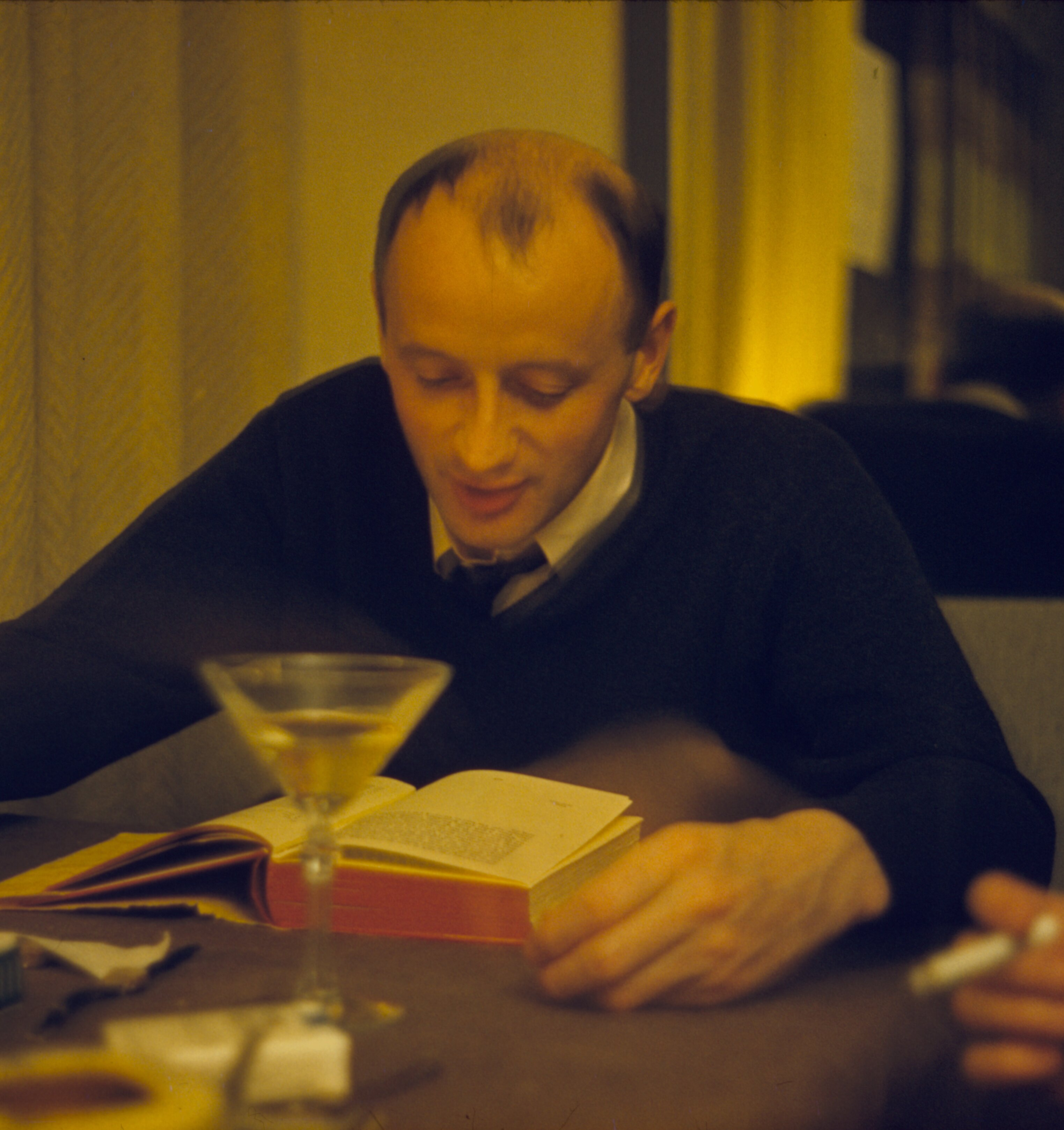
Kevin Roche

- 1 March – Kevin Roche, 96, architect, Pritzker Prize winner (1982).
- 2 March – Liam Gilmartin, 97, Gaelic footballer (Roscommon).
- 4 March – Edward Collins, 78, politician, TD (1969–1987).
- 14 March – Pat Laffan, 79, actor (The Snapper, Father Ted).
- 16 March – Dessie Larkin, 49, politician, Councillor (1999–2014).
- 17 March
  - Richie Ryan, 90, politician, TD (1959–1982), MEP (1973–1977, 1979–1984) and Minister for Finance and the Public Service (1973–1977).
  - Mick Carley, 78, Gaelic footballer (Westmeath).
  - Bernie Tormé, 66, guitarist, singer and songwriter, pneumonia.
- 18 March – Jackie Fahey, 91, politician, TD (1965–1992) and Minister of State (1979–1981).
- 20 March – Laura Brennan, 26, HPV vaccine campaigner, cervical cancer.
- 22 March - Philomena Canning, 59, activist and campaigner for women's health and birth rights, ovarian cancer.
- 26 March - Bronco McLoughlin, 80, actor, stuntman and animal trainer.
- 27 March – John Browne, 82, politician, Senator (1983–1987) and TD (1989–2002).

=== April ===
- 2 April – Michael Fahy, 78, politician, Councillor (1979–2019).
- 3 April – Pádraig Ó hUiginn, 94, civil servant.
- 20 April – Terence Dolan, 76, academic and compiler of "A Dictionary of Hiberno-English."
- 25 April – Feargal Quinn, 82, businessman and Senator (1983–2016), short illness.

=== May ===
- 5 May – Eugene McGee, 77, journalist and Gaelic football manager (Offaly, Cavan, national team).
- 16 May – Tommy O'Connell, 79, hurler (Fenians, Kilkenny).
- 17 May – Anton O'Toole, 68, Gaelic footballer (Synge Street P.P., Dublin).
- 19 May – Howard Kilroy, 83, accountant and businessman.
- 21 May – Michael Lynch, 84, politician, TD (1982 and 1987–1989) and Senator (1983–1987).
- 23 May – Pegg Monahan, 97, actress.
- 25 May – Séamus McGrane, 64, dissident republican (Real IRA), heart attack.
- 31 May – Paddy Fahey, 102, composer and fiddler.

=== June ===
- 5 June
  - Johnny McGrath, 88, hurler (Nenagh Éire Óg, Tipperary).
  - John Lynch, 86, Gaelic footballer (Tuam Stars, Roscommon).
- 7 June – Ned Wheeler, 87, hurler (Faythe Harriers, Wexford, Leinster).
- 9 June – Pádraig Carney, 91, Gaelic footballer (Castlebar Mitchels, Mayo, Connacht), short illness.
- 12 June – Philomena Lynott, 88, author, entrepreneur and mother of Phil Lynott, cancer.
- 18 June – Tom Dillon, 93, Gaelic footballer (Ahascragh, Galway, Connacht).
- 20 June – Jimmy Reardon, 93, Olympic sprinter.
- 23 June
  - Manus Kelly, 41, rally driver, businessman and politician, Councillor (2019), race collision.
  - John Dillon, 76, hurler (Roscrea, Tipperary).
- 25 June - Alfie Linehan, 79, cricketer (national team).
- 28 June – Tom Jordan, 82, actor (Fair City).
- 30 June – Brídín Uí Mhaolagáin, President of the Camogie Association (1991–1994).

=== July ===
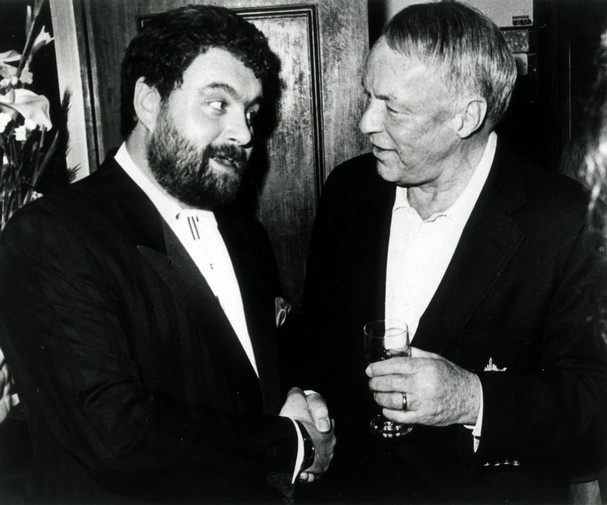
Brendan Grace (left)

- 1 July – Mary Coyne, 108, Ireland's oldest person.
- 8 July – Arthur Ryan, 83, businessman, short illness.
- 9 July – John Bailey, 74, Gaelic games administrator and politician, Councillor (2004–2019), long illness.
- 10 July – Noel Whelan, 50, barrister and political analyst, short illness.
- 11 July
  - Brendan Grace, 68, comedian and singer, lung cancer.
  - Séamus Hetherton, 89, Gaelic footballer (Cavan).
- 14 July – Robert Elgie, 54, academic.
- 15 July - Karl Shiels, 47, actor.
- 16 July – Tommy Byrne, politician, Councillor (1999-2009 and 2014–2019), short illness.
- 21 July – Eddie Bohan, 86, politician, Senator (1987–2007).
- 23 July – Danika McGuigan, 33, actress, cancer.
- 25 July – P. J. Qualter, 76, hurler (Turloughmore, Galway).
- 31 July – Brendan Fennelly, 63, hurler (Ballyhale Shamrocks, Kilkenny) and manager (Carlow, Laois).

=== August ===
- 6 August – Danny Doyle, 79, folk singer.
- 12 August – John Coffey, 101, hurler (Boherlahan-Dualla, Tipperary).
- 14 August – Billy Purcell, 58, hurler (Fenians, Kilkenny).
- 18 August – Gillian Hanna, 75, actress (Les Misérables, All the Queen's Men, Oliver Twist), autoimmune disease.

=== September ===
- 19 September – Sandie Jones, 68, singer, long illness.
- 20 September – Séamus Hegarty, 79, Roman Catholic prelate, Bishop of Raphoe (1982–1994) and Derry (1994–2011).
- 21 September – Gerard Mannion, 48, theologian.
- 25 September – John McAdorey, 45, athlete, cancer.
- 28 September – Dessie O'Halloran, 79, singer and fiddler, short illness.

=== October ===
- 6 October – Seán Clohessy, 87, hurler (Tullaroan, Kilkenny, Leinster).
- 7 October – Ulick O'Connor, 90, writer, historian and critic.
- 9 October
  - Éamonn Burns, 56, Gaelic footballer and manager (Bryansford, Down).
  - Thomas Flanagan, 89, Roman Catholic prelate, Auxiliary Bishop Emeritus of San Antonio (1998–2005).
- 28 October – Art Foley, 90, hurler (Wexford, Leinster).
- 29 October
  - Pat Griffin, 75, Gaelic footballer (Glenbeigh-Glencar, Clonakilty, Kerry, Munster).
  - Johnny Joyce, 82, Gaelic footballer (St. Vincent's, Dublin, Leinster).
- 30 October – Tom MacIntyre, 87, poet, playwright and writer.
- 31 October – Denis Bernard, 86, Gaelic footballer (Dohenys, Cork, Munster).

=== November ===
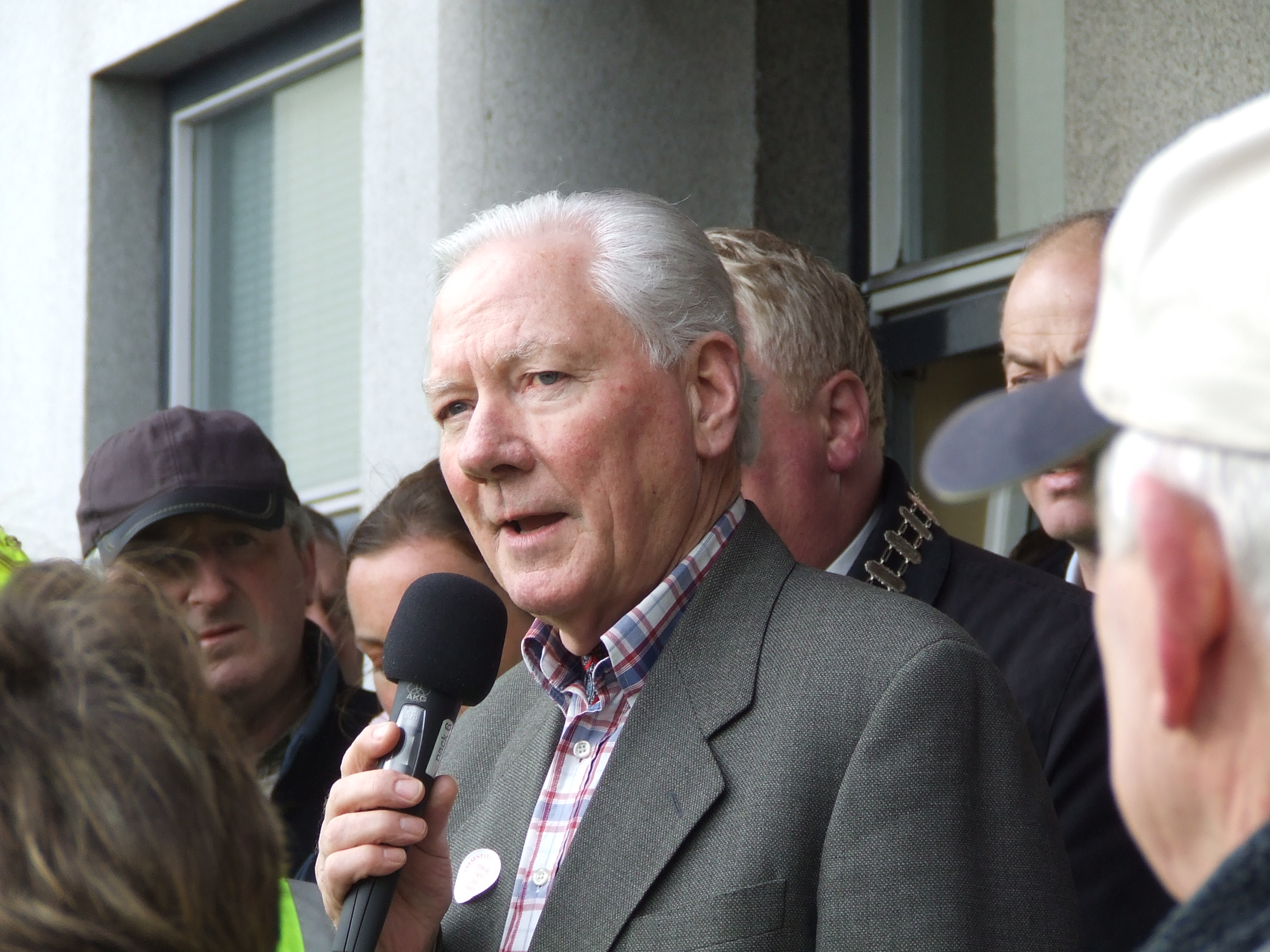
Gay Byrne

- 1 November – Daniel Mullins, 90, Roman Catholic prelate, Bishop of Menevia (1987–2001).
- 4 November – Gay Byrne, 85, broadcaster (The Late Late Show The Gay Byrne Show), cancer.
- 9 November – Cecil Pedlow, 84, rugby union player (Lions, national team).
- 13 November – Niall Tóibín, 89, actor and comedian, complications from dementia.
- 25 November
  - Muiris Mac Conghail, 78, journalist, writer and broadcaster.
  - Terry Kelly, 86, hurler (Tracton, Blackrock, Cork, Munster), long illness.

=== December ===
- 10 December – Paul Anthony McDermott, 47, barrister and academic, short illness.
- 13 December – Roy Johnston, 90, physicist and political activist.
- 14 December
  - Billie Rattigan, 87, Gaelic footballer, (Dunshaughlin, Meath).
  - Barbara Wright, 84, academic and translator.
- 17 December – Con Hartnett, 68, Gaelic footballer, (Millstreet, Cork).
- 21 December – Frankie Kennedy, 78, Gaelic footballer, (Drumlane, Cavan).
- 28 December – Jean Costello, 76, actress (Fair City).

== See also ==
- 2019 European Parliament election
- CervicalCheck cancer scandal
