= Eric Robertson (literary critic) =

British academic

Eric Robertson is a British academic, Professor of Modern French Literary and Visual Culture at Royal Holloway, University of London.

== Work ==
Robertson's research focuses on 20th century French literature, especially poetry, and the visual arts, with particular emphasis on European Modernism and the avant-gardes. He is the author of Arp: Painter, Poet, Sculptor (2006), Writing Between the Lines (1995), a study of the bilingual novelist and essayist René Schickele, and various articles and chapters on 20th century French literature, especially poetry, and visual arts. He is also the co-editor of Yvan Goll - Claire Goll: Texts and Contexts (1997), Robert Desnos: Surrealism in the Twenty-First Century (2006), Dada and Beyond Volume 1: Dada Discourses (2011) and Dada and Beyond Volume 2: Dada and its Legacies (2012). In 2022, Robertson's authored book Blaise Cendrars: the Invention of Life was published by Reaktion Books. It examines the poems, novels, essays and autobiographical prose of Swiss-born French writer Blaise Cendrars (1887–1961) against a turbulent historical background and reassesses his contribution to twentieth-century literature. Further ongoing projects include a study of avant-garde art and virtual technologies.

Arp: Painter, Poet, Sculptor, published by Yale University Press, considers the close connections between the writing, painting and sculpture of Hans Jean Arp and reassesses his contribution to major artistic movements of the 20th century. This book was awarded the 2007 R.H. Gapper Book Prize. The award, made annually by the Society for French Studies, is for the best book by a scholar working in Britain or Ireland in French studies.

In 2017–18, Robertson co-curated the international touring exhibition Arp: the Poetry of Forms with independent curator Frances Guy. The exhibition was hosted by the Kröller-Müller Museum from May to September 2017 and by Turner Contemporary from October 2017 to January 2018. It was widely reviewed in the press and media; The Guardian showcased it in 'The Best Art of Autumn 2017'.

In 2017, Robertson was the featured expert appearing in two short films on the writings of Hans Jean Arp and René Schickele shown as part of the exhibition Laboratoire d’Europe: Strasbourg 1880-1930 curated by the Musées de la Ville de Strasbourg.

From September 2018 to January 2019, the Nasher Sculpture Center (Dallas, Texas) hosted the exhibition The Nature of Arp which travelled to the Peggy Guggenheim Collection (Venice, Italy) from April to September 2019. At the opening symposium, Robertson presented the paper "Words Without Borders: Arp's Bilingual Poetry" and took part in the panel discussion.

In 2021, Robertson delivered the inaugural Barbara Wright Memorial Lecture at Trinity College Dublin.

Robertson wrote the essay for the book Joan Miró: Feet on the Ground, Eyes on the Stars: Works from 1924 to 1936, published by Luxembourg + Co and Ridinghouse in 2022. The book accompanied the exhibition held from 7 September to 26 November 2022 to inaugurate the new premises of Luxembourg + Co in the Fuller Building, New York City.

=== Publications ===
Authored, co-authored and edited books

- Blaise Cendrars: the Invention of Life (London: Reaktion Books, 2022; ISBN 9781789145205)
- Joan Miró: Feet on the Ground, Eyes on the Stars: Works from 1924 to 1936 (London: Luxembourg + Co and Ridinghouse, 2022; ISBN 9781909932777)
- Jean-Michel Basquiat | Xerox. Co-authored with Dieter Buchhart and Christopher Stackhouse (Berlin and Stuttgart: Hatje Cantz, 2019; ISBN 978-3-7757-4585-7)
- Words Without Thoughts Never to Heaven Go. Co-authored with Dieter Buchhart and Richard Shiff (New York: Almine Rech Gallery Editions, 2018; ISBN 978-2-930573-26-7)
- Arp: The Poetry of Forms (Otterlo: Kröller-Müller Museum, 2017, co-authored with Frances Guy; ISBN 9789073313439)
- Schwitters Miró Arp. Co-authored with Dieter Buchhart, William Jeffett and Gwendolen Webster (Munich, London, New York: Prestel Verlag, 2016; ISBN 9783791355924)
- Dada and Beyond, vol 2: Dada and its Legacies, ed. with Elza Adamowicz (Amsterdam and New York: Rodopi, 2012; ISBN 9789401208642)
- Dada and Beyond, vol 1: Dada Discourses, ed. with Elza Adamowicz (Amsterdam and New York: Rodopi, 2011; ISBN 9789401200547)
- Arp: Painter, Poet, Sculptor (New Haven and London: Yale University Press, 2006; ISBN 9780300106909)
- Robert Desnos: Surrealism in the Twenty-First Century, ed. with Marie-Claire Barnet and Nigel Saint (Oxford, Bern, Berlin, Bruxelles, Frankfurt am Main, New York, Vienna: Peter Lang, 2006; ISBN 9783039110193)
- Yvan Goll – Claire Goll: Texts and Contexts, ed. with Robert Vilain (Amsterdam and Atlanta: Rodopi, 1997; ISBN 9780854571833)
- Writing Between the Lines: René Schickele, 'Citoyen français, deutscher Dichter' 1883-1940 (Amsterdam and Atlanta: Rodopi, 1995; ISBN 9789051837117)
