= Elgie =

Elgie is a surname. Notable people with the surname include:

- Kim Elgie (1933–2025), South African cricketer
- Goldwin Elgie (1896–1975), Canadian lawyer and politician
- Robert Elgie (1929–2013), Canadian politician
- Robert Elgie (academic) (1965–2019), Irish academic

== See also ==
- Ellie
