= Semi-presidential system =

System of government

World's states colored by systems of government: Parliamentary systems: Head of government is elected or nominated by and accountable to the legislature. Constitutional monarchy with a ceremonial monarch Semi-constitutional monarchy: Monarch holds significant executive or legislative power but is still restricted by the constitution. Parliamentary republic with a ceremonial president Parliamentary republic with an executive president Presidential system: Head of government (president) is popularly elected and independent of the legislature. Presidential republic Theocratic presidential republic: Supreme leader is highest authority; popularly elected president still exists. Hybrid systems: Semi-presidential republic: Executive president is independent of the legislature; head of government is appointed by the president and is accountable to the legislature. Assembly-independent republic: Head of government (president or directory) is elected by the legislature, but is not accountable to it. Other systems: Islamic theocracy: Supreme leader holds unlimited political and religious power; state and faith are a single institution. Absolute monarchy: Monarch has unlimited power. One-party state: Power is constitutionally linked to a single political party. Provisional government: Current regime is temporary or transitional; no permanent constitution. Military junta: Committee of military leaders controls the government; constitutional provisions are suspended. Places without governments. Note: this chart represents the de jure systems of government, not the de facto degree of democracy.

A semi-presidential system or dual executive system is a system in which a president exists alongside a prime minister and a cabinet, with the prime minister and cabinet being responsible to the legislature of the state. It differs from a parliamentary system in that it has an executive president independent of the legislature; and from the presidential system in that the cabinet, although named by the president, is responsible to the legislature, which may force the cabinet to resign through a motion of no confidence.

While the Weimar Republic (1919–1933) and Finland (from 1919 to 2000) exemplified early semi-presidential systems, the term "semi-presidential" was first introduced in 1959, in an article by the journalist Hubert Beuve-Méry, and popularized by a 1978 work written by the political scientist Maurice Duverger. Both men intended to describe the French Fifth Republic (established in 1958). The semi-presidential system is distinct from semi-parliamentary systems, where instead of the executive being dual, the legislature is split into two parts, one having the authority to dismiss the cabinet through a motion of no confidence. It is also distinct from the (directly elected) prime-ministerial system that Duverger originally proposed for France.

== Definition ==
Maurice Duverger's original definition of semi-presidentialism stated that the president had to be elected, possess significant power, and serve for a fixed term.

Others, such as Robert Elgie propose an alternate definition which simply requires that "a popularly-elected fixed-term president exists alongside a prime minister and cabinet who are responsible to parliament."

== Subtypes ==
There are two distinct subtypes of semi-presidentialism: premier-presidentialism and president-parliamentarism.

Under the premier-presidential system, the prime minister and cabinet are exclusively accountable to parliament. The president may choose the prime minister and cabinet, but only the parliament may approve them and remove them from office with a vote of no confidence. This system is much closer to pure parliamentarism. This subtype is used in: Burkina Faso, Cape Verde, East Timor, France, Lithuania, Madagascar, Mali, Mongolia, Niger, Georgia, (Note: 2013–2018) Portugal, Romania, São Tomé and Príncipe, Sri Lanka, Turkey, (Note: de facto between 2014 and 2018, until the constitutional referendum to switch the government to presidential from parliamentary) and Ukraine. (Note: since 2014; previously, between 2006 and 2010.)

Under the president-parliamentary system, the prime minister and cabinet are dually accountable to the president and the parliament. The president chooses the prime minister and the cabinet but must have the support of a parliamentary majority for his choice. To remove a prime minister, or the whole cabinet, from power, the president can either dismiss them, or the parliament can remove them through a vote of no confidence. This form of semi-presidentialism is much closer to pure presidentialism. It is used in: Azerbaijan, Guinea-Bissau, Kazakhstan, Mozambique, Russia, and Taiwan. It was also used in Ukraine, (Note: first between 1996 and 2005; then from 2010 to 2014) Georgia, (Note: from 2004 to 2013) South Korea under the Fourth and Fifth republics, and in Germany during the Weimar Republic.

== Cohabitation ==
In a semi-presidential system, the president and the prime minister may sometimes be from different political parties. This is called "cohabitation", a term which originated in France after the situation first arose in the 1980s. Cohabitation can create either an effective system of checks and balances, or a period of bitter and tense stonewalling, depending on the attitudes of the two leaders, the ideologies of themselves and their parties, and the demands of their supporters.

== Division of powers ==
The distribution of power between the president and the prime minister can vary greatly between countries.

In France, for example, in the case of cohabitation, the president oversees foreign policy and defence policy (these are generally called les prérogatives présidentielles, presidential prerogatives) and the prime minister is in charge of domestic policy and economic policy. In this case, the division of responsibilities between the prime minister and the president is not explicitly stated in the constitution, but has evolved as a political convention based on the constitutional principle that the prime minister is appointed (with the subsequent approval of a parliament majority) and dismissed by the president. On the other hand, whenever the president and the prime minister represent the same political party, which leads the cabinet, they tend to exercise de facto control over all fields of policy via the prime minister. However, it is up to the president to decide how much autonomy is left to the prime minister.

In most cases, cohabitation results from a system in which the two executives are not elected at the same time or for the same term. For example, in 1981, France elected both a Socialist president and legislature, which yielded a Socialist premier. But while the president's term of office was for seven years, the National Assembly only served for five. When, in the 1986 legislative election, the French people elected a right-of-centre assembly, Socialist president François Mitterrand was forced into cohabitation with right-wing premier Jacques Chirac.

However, in 2000, amendments to the French constitution reduced the length of the French president's term to five years. This has significantly lowered the chances of cohabitation occurring, as parliamentary and presidential elections may now be conducted within a shorter span of each other.

== Advantages and disadvantages ==
The incorporation of elements from both presidential and parliamentary systems can bring certain advantageous elements; however, it also creates disadvantages, often related to the confusion produced by mixed authority patterns. It can be argued that a semi-presidential system is more likely to engage in democratic backsliding and power struggles, especially ones with a president-parliamentary system.

Advantages

- Parliament can remove an unpopular prime minister, therefore maintaining stability throughout the president's fixed term.
- In most semi-presidential systems, important segments of bureaucracy are taken away from the president, creating additional checks and balances where the running of the day-to-day government and its issues are separate from the head of state, and as such, its issues tend to be looked at on their own merits, with their ebbs and flows and not necessarily tied to who the head of state is.
- Having a separate head of government who needs to command the confidence of the parliament is seen as being more in tune to the political and economic development of the country. Because the head of government is elected from the parliament, there is little potential for political gridlock to occur, since the parliament has the power to remove the head of government if needed.

Disadvantages

- The system provides cover for the president, as unpopular policies could be blamed on the prime minister, who runs the day-to-day operations of the government.
- It creates a sense of confusion towards accountability, as there is no relatively clear sense of who is responsible for policy successes and failures.
- It creates both confusion and inefficiency in the legislative process, since the capacity of votes of confidence makes the prime minister respond to the parliament.

== Countries with a semi-presidential system of government ==
==== President-parliamentary systems ====
In a president-parliamentary system, the prime minister and cabinet are dually accountable to the president and the legislature.

- Austria (Note: Austria is de jure semi-presidential according to the country's Constitution, but is de facto more like a parliamentary republic. According to the constitutional convention, the Chancellor is the country's leading political figure, despite nominally being ranked third according to the Constitution.)
- Azerbaijan
- Belarus
- Chad
- Congo, Republic of the
- Kazakhstan
- Mauritania
- Mozambique (Note: The Prime Minister is not the head of government; instead, the President serves as both head of state and government. However, as the Prime Minister and the cabinet are responsible to the legislature as well with the President, the nation is still usually classified as a semi-presidential republic.)
- Namibia
- Peru
- Russia
- Rwanda
- South Ossetia
- Sri Lanka
- Taiwan (Note: Nominally a parliamentary republic; the semi-presidential system is based on temporary additional articles. According to the Constitution of the Republic of China, the National Assembly indirectly elects the President of the Republic, which is the ceremonial figurehead of the state. Executive power rested with the Premier of the Republic of China, who is nominated and appointed by the president, with the consent of the Legislative Yuan. The additional articles made the President directly elected by the citizens of the free area and replaced Legislative Yuan confirmation for Premieral appointments with a conventional vote of no confidence, superseding the ordinary constitutional provisions. A Sunset provision in the additional articles will terminate them in the event of a hypothetical resumption of ROC rule in Mainland China.)
- Transnistria
- Uzbekistan

Non-UN members are in italics.

==== Premier-presidential systems ====
In a premier-presidential system, the prime minister and cabinet are exclusively accountable to the legislature.

- Algeria
- Cape Verde
- Congo, Democratic Republic of the
- Egypt
- France
- Haiti
- Lithuania
- Mongolia
- Northern Cyprus
- Portugal
- Romania
- São Tomé and Príncipe
- Timor-Leste
- Ukraine

Non-UN members are in italics.

=== Former semi-presidential countries ===
- All-Palestine (1948–1959)
- Armenia (1991–2018) (Note: Parliamentary republic as a Soviet member-state in 1990, and after independence it was a semi-presidential republic under president-parliamentary system in 1991–2018, and has been a parliamentary republic since 2018. After the major 2015 constitutional changes, it was transformed into full parliamentary system, implementation of what happened in 2018.)
- Bangladesh (1975–1991) (Note: Parliamentary in 1972–1975, semi-presidential in 1975–1991, and again parliamentary since 1991.)
- Croatia (1990–2000)
- Cuba (1940–1976)
- Finland (1919–2000)
- Georgia (1991–1995, 2004–2019) (Note: As the Georgian SSR and after independence, parliamentary in 1990–1991, semi-presidential in 1991–1995, presidential in 1995–2004, semi-presidential in 2004–2019 and parliamentary since 2019.)
- Germany (1919–1933) (Note: For more information, see Weimar Republic.)
- Greece (1973–1974) (Note: The Greek Constitution of 1973, enacted in the waning days of the Greek Junta, provided for a powerful directly-elected president and a government dependent on Parliamentary confidence. Neither of these provisions was implemented, as the regime collapsed eight months after the Constitution's promulgation.)
- Kyrgyzstan (1993–2021) (Note: One-party parliamentary republic as a Soviet member-state in 1936–1990, a presidential republic in 1990–1993, a semi-presidential republic in 1993–2010 and a de facto semi-presidential republic; de jure a parliamentary republic in 2010–2021.)
- Mali (1991–2023)
- Moldova (1990–2001)
- North Macedonia (1991–2001)
- North Vietnam (1945-1959)
- Pakistan (1956–1973, 1978–1985, 2001–2008)
- Philippines (1978–1986) (Note: For more information, see Fourth Philippine Republic.)
- Russian SFSR (July–November 1991) (Note: One-party parliamentary republic as a Soviet member-state in 1918–1991 and semi-presidential republic in 1991)
- Somalia (1960–1969)
- Soviet Union (1990–1991) (Note: A parliamentary system in which the leader of the state-sponsored party was supreme in 1918–1990 and a semi-presidential republic in 1990–1991.)
- South Korea (1972–1988) (Note: All South Korean constitutions since 1963 provided for a strong executive presidency; in addition, the formally authoritarian Yushin Constitution of the Fourth Republic established a presidential power to dissolve the National Assembly, nominally counterbalanced by a binding vote of no confidence. Both of these provisions were retained during the Fifth Republic but repealed upon the transition to democracy and the establishment of the presidential Sixth Republic.)
- Yugoslavia, FR (2000–2003) (Note: Previously an assembly-independent republic from 1992 to 2000, but this polity was not recognized as the successor to the former SFR Yugoslavia. It was replaced by a confederation in 2003 before dissolving itself in 2006.)

== See also ==
- List of countries by system of government
- Parliamentary system
- Presidential system
- Semi-parliamentary system
