= Maria Bailey =

Irish politician (born 1975)

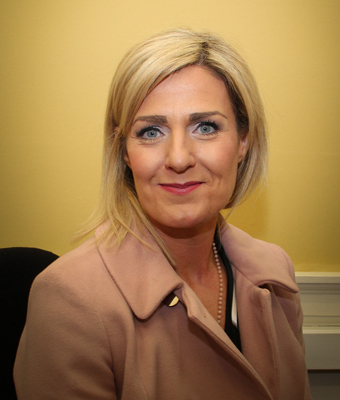
- Bailey in 2016

Teachta Dála
- In office February 2016 – February 2020
- Constituency: Dún Laoghaire

Chair of the Committee on Housing, Planning and Local Government
- In office 4 April 2016 – 29 July 2019
- Preceded by: New office
- Succeeded by: Noel Rock

Dún Laoghaire–Rathdown County Councillor
- In office May 2014 – February 2016
- Constituency: Killiney–Shankill
- In office June 2004 – May 2014
- Constituency: Ballybrack

Personal details
- Born: 21 November 1975 (age 50) Dalkey, Dublin, Ireland
- Party: Fine Gael
- Spouse: James Ryan (m. 2004)
- Children: 2
- Parent: John Bailey (father)
- Education: University College Dublin

Maria Bailey (born 21 November 1975) is an Irish former Fine Gael politician who served as a Teachta Dála (TD) for the Dún Laoghaire constituency from 2016 to 2020. She served as Chair of the Committee on Housing, Planning and Local Government from 2016 to 2019.

Her career in Dáil Éireann ended after a personal injury controversy known as "swing-gate", which led to her de-selection by Fine Gael as a candidate in the 2020 general election.

She was a member of Dún Laoghaire–Rathdown County Council from 2004 to 2016. Bailey is the daughter of former Dún Laoghaire–Rathdown County Councillor John Bailey.

== Legal claim ==
A lawsuit by Bailey against Press Up Entertainment and the Dean Hotel for alleged injuries, following a fall from an indoor swing in July 2015, attracted controversy and criticism in the media and in the Oireachtas in May 2019. The controversy became known as "swing-gate".

Bailey alleges she injured herself after falling from the swing, and that no instructions in how to use the swing had been provided and that it was unsupervised. The hotel fought the case and maintained that Bailey was holding items in both hands when she fell. The case arose at a time when there is "considerable political focus on personal injury awards and high insurance costs." Independent Senator Michael McDowell, speaking about the case in the Seanad, said: "It does occur to me that we live in a strange world where civil liability can exist in such circumstances but maybe we are only hearing a portion of the evidence. If the Government is serious about driving down the claims culture, we cannot stand idly by when adults lose their seat with two objects, one in each hand, and fall off a swing and then claim there should have been a supervisor looking after them." She had reportedly been holding a beer in one hand and a wine bottle in the other. Leader of the Opposition Micheál Martin said the case "flies in the face of everything being done to keep insurance costs down."

She dropped the compensation claim after it emerged that she had run a 10 km race in under an hour, only three weeks after the fall, despite claiming in court documents that she could not run in the three months after the accident. The Irish Independent also reposted social media pictures of Bailey attending the Longitude Music Festival eight days after the alleged incident.

Two days after polling day in the 2019 local elections, Taoiseach Leo Varadkar said that news of the compensation claim in the week preceding the elections had caused reputational damage to Fine Gael. On 27 May, Bailey gave an interview described by some Fine Gael colleagues as "a car crash" and "the worst political interview I’ve ever heard", on the Today with Seán O'Rourke RTÉ radio programme. In the interview, she said that the media had "crossed the line of public invasion and humanity." Health minister Simon Harris said of the interview "I think it was an unfortunate interview. I think when you withdraw a claim I think it is in and of itself an acknowledgement of the fact that perhaps that claim shouldn’t have proceeded, yet the interview seems to be very much in the space of blaming lots of other people." On 29 May, Fine Gael announced it was going to undertake "an internal review to establish all facts." In July 2019, Leo Varadkar announced that as a result of the review, Bailey was being removed as chair of the Oireachtas Housing Committee.

In May 2020, it was reported that Bailey had lodged a High Court defamation proceedings against the publisher of the Irish Daily Mirror. The same month, a prominent personal injuries lawyer told the Irish Independent that, one year after it first made the headlines, the Bailey case was "probably the single most important event in the whole controversy over damages and claims and compo culture", with solicitors "think[ing] much longer and harder" about which cases to become involved with and claimants "far more reluctant to get themselves tarred by the Maria Bailey brush".

In June 2024, the Irish Independent announced that Bailey had lost a case she had initiated against it and other entities in the same media group, in a complaint made to the Data Protection Commissioner in 2020. Bailey had complained that her health privacy had been breached, and that being a public representative should not mean that she was open to "public scrutiny". Mediahuis Ireland defended the case, arguing that insurance fraud and "compo culture" was being debated publicly, that "A government TD must accept they are exposed to a higher standard of public scrutiny than ordinary citizens," and "the simple factual position is that an elected representative gave sworn evidence in writing that was patently untrue." The DPC in its ruling stated that the Irish Independent "was reporting on matters in the public interest" and "it is clear that the private sphere of the politicians is narrower."

== Deselection ==
As the controversy unfolded, Bailey faced criticism from her own party and constituency members, including calls for her to be removed as a candidate in the next general election.

In October 2019, a vote of no-confidence was put forward from her own constituency members but was deferred until a later date, while elected colleagues removed her image from their social media platforms. In November 2019, the Fine Gael National Executive voted to deselect her as a candidate in the next general election.

On Virgin Media's "The Tonight Show" on 8 July 2026, it was revealed to former Taoiseach Leo Varadkar that Bailey was placed on a suicide watch following her deselection from Fine Gael.

Dáil	Election	Deputy (Party)	Deputy (Party)	Deputy (Party)	Deputy (Party)	Deputy (Party)
21st	1977	David Andrews (FF)	Liam Cosgrave (FG)	Barry Desmond (Lab)	Martin O'Donoghue (FF)	4 seats 1977–1981
22nd	1981	David Andrews (FF)	Liam T. Cosgrave (FG)	Barry Desmond (Lab)	Martin O'Donoghue (FF)	Seán Barrett (FG)
23rd	1982 (Feb)	David Andrews (FF)	Liam T. Cosgrave (FG)	Barry Desmond (Lab)	Martin O'Donoghue (FF)	Seán Barrett (FG)
24th	1982 (Nov)	David Andrews (FF)	Liam T. Cosgrave (FG)	Barry Desmond (Lab)	Monica Barnes (FG)	Seán Barrett (FG)
25th	1987	David Andrews (FF)	Geraldine Kennedy (PDs)	Barry Desmond (Lab)	Monica Barnes (FG)	Seán Barrett (FG)
26th	1989	David Andrews (FF)	Brian Hillery (FF)	Eamon Gilmore (WP)	Monica Barnes (FG)	Seán Barrett (FG)
27th	1992	David Andrews (FF)	Helen Keogh (PDs)	Eamon Gilmore (DL)	Niamh Bhreathnach (Lab)	Seán Barrett (FG)
28th	1997	David Andrews (FF)	Monica Barnes (FG)	Eamon Gilmore (Lab)	Mary Hanafin (FF)	Seán Barrett (FG)
29th	2002	Barry Andrews (FF)	Fiona O'Malley (PDs)	Eamon Gilmore (Lab)	Mary Hanafin (FF)	Ciarán Cuffe (GP)
30th	2007	Barry Andrews (FF)	Seán Barrett (Note: Served as Ceann Comhairle in the 31st Dáil from 2011 to 2016 and was returned automatically at the 2016 general election.) (FG)	Eamon Gilmore (Lab)	Mary Hanafin (FF)	Ciarán Cuffe (GP)
31st	2011	Mary Mitchell O'Connor (FG)	Seán Barrett (FG)	Eamon Gilmore (Lab)	Richard Boyd Barrett (PBP)	4 seats from 2011
32nd	2016	Mary Mitchell O'Connor (FG)	Seán Barrett (FG)	Maria Bailey (FG)	Richard Boyd Barrett (AAA–PBP)	4 seats from 2011
33rd	2020	Jennifer Carroll MacNeill (FG)	Ossian Smyth (GP)	Cormac Devlin (FF)	Richard Boyd Barrett (S–PBP)	4 seats from 2011
34th	2024	Jennifer Carroll MacNeill (FG)	Barry Ward (FG)	Cormac Devlin (FF)	Richard Boyd Barrett (PBP–S)	4 seats from 2011
