= Noel Rock =

Irish politician (born 1987)

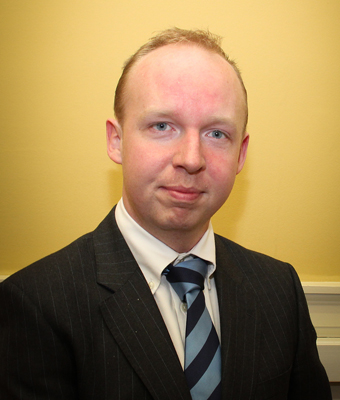
- Rock in 2016

Chair of the Committee on Housing, Planning and Local Government
- In office 16 Sept 2019 – 14 Jan 2020
- Preceded by: Maria Bailey
- Succeeded by: Steven Matthews

Teachta Dála
- In office February 2016 – February 2020
- Constituency: Dublin North-West

Personal details
- Born: 11 November 1987 (age 38) Ballymun, Dublin, Ireland
- Party: Fine Gael
- Education: Dublin City University

Noel Rock (born 11 November 1987) is an Irish Fine Gael politician who served as a Teachta Dála (TD) for the Dublin North-West constituency from 2016 to 2020. He previously served as Chair of the Committee on Housing, Planning and Local Government from 2019 to 2020.

== Early life and career ==
Rock was born in Dublin and grew up in the Ballymun and Glasnevin areas, where he was raised by his mother and grandparents. He was educated at Our Lady of Victories National Boys' School, Ballymun and St. Aidan's CBS in Whitehall. He attended Dublin City University (DCU), where he was the chair of the university's branch of Young Fine Gael. He remains an active member of Young Fine Gael.

While studying at DCU, Rock interned with then US Senator Hillary Clinton as a legislative intern focusing on foreign policy. He later interned in Iowa with her 2008 Presidential campaign ahead of the Iowa Caucuses. He welcomed Clinton to DCU for a speech in 2012. He has also worked as an assistant manager for the Washington Ireland Program and as a press assistant with the European Parliament. Following his time in DCU he worked in communications for a startup cloud computing company.

Rock first ran for a seat on the Dublin City Council in 2009, and was the last candidate deemed to not be elected in his LEA. In 2011, he was a campaign organiser for John Paul Phelan, which successfully sought to elect Phelan to Dáil Éireann for Carlow–Kilkenny, where he topped the poll. Rock has also worked as a secretarial assistant for Catherine Noone, a former Senator on the Industrial and Commercial Panel.

== Dublin City Council ==
After unsuccessfully contesting the Artane-Whitehall LEA at the 2009 local election, Rock once more ran in the reconfigured Ballymun ward at the 2014 local elections. Despite a poor showing by Fine Gael nationwide, Rock won election to Dublin City Council and took the third seat in a seven-seat constituency. During the 2014 local elections, Rock made a "No Expense Pledge" where he would not take the €36,000 allowance given to councillors. This was fulfilled: for his time as a Councillor, he took €0 in expenses.

== Dáil Éireann ==
Rock was elected to the Dáil at the 2016 general election. He represented the Dublin North-West constituency. While serving as a TD, Rock emphasised local projects to improve transportation, including the expansion of the LUAS to Finglas, adding bus routes and introducing Dublin's first 24-hour bus service. Rock proposed a bill to end ticket touting in 2019. In 2016, Rock encouraged the Irish government to increase the minimum wage by more than the 10-cent raise recommended by the non-partisan Low Pay Commission. The minimum wage was increased by 30 cent the next year.

In September 2019, Taoiseach Leo Varadkar appointed Rock to become chair of the Oireachtas Housing Committee in place of Maria Bailey, which was seen as significant, as he was the first Fine Gael TD to condemn Bailey at the time. He chaired the committee until the 2020 general election and oversaw the passage of several important pieces of legislation such as the Housing (Regulation of Approved Housing Bodies) Bill 2019 as well as authoring the committee's report into the General Scheme of the Land Development Agency Bill 2019.

Following a redrawing of Dublin North-West, Rock lost his seat at the 2020 general election. He was an unsuccessful candidate at the 2020 Seanad election.

Rock was the Fine Gael candidate for Dublin North-West at the 2024 general election, and was not elected.

Dáil	Election	Deputy (Party)	Deputy (Party)	Deputy (Party)	Deputy (Party)
2nd	1921	Philip Cosgrave (SF)	Joseph McGrath (SF)	Richard Mulcahy (SF)	Michael Staines (SF)
3rd	1922	Philip Cosgrave (PT-SF)	Joseph McGrath (PT-SF)	Richard Mulcahy (PT-SF)	Michael Staines (PT-SF)
4th	1923	Constituency abolished. See Dublin North			

Dáil	Election	Deputy (Party)	Deputy (Party)	Deputy (Party)	Deputy (Party)	Deputy (Party)
9th	1937	Seán T. O'Kelly (FF)	A. P. Byrne (Ind.)	Cormac Breathnach (FF)	Patrick McGilligan (FG)	Archie Heron (Lab)
10th	1938	Seán T. O'Kelly (FF)	A. P. Byrne (Ind.)	Cormac Breathnach (FF)	Patrick McGilligan (FG)	Eamonn Cooney (FF)
11th	1943	Seán T. O'Kelly (FF)	A. P. Byrne (Ind.)	Cormac Breathnach (FF)	Patrick McGilligan (FG)	Martin O'Sullivan (Lab)
12th	1944	Seán T. O'Kelly (FF)	John S. O'Connor (FF)	Cormac Breathnach (FF)	Patrick McGilligan (FG)	Martin O'Sullivan (Lab)
12th	1945 by-election	Vivion de Valera (FF)	John S. O'Connor (FF)	Cormac Breathnach (FF)	Patrick McGilligan (FG)	Martin O'Sullivan (Lab)
13th	1948	Mick Fitzpatrick (CnaP)	A. P. Byrne (Ind.)	Cormac Breathnach (FF)	3 seats from 1948 to 1969	
14th	1951	Declan Costello (FG)	A. P. Byrne (Ind.)	Cormac Breathnach (FF)	3 seats from 1948 to 1969	
14th	1952 by-election	Declan Costello (FG)	Thomas Byrne (Ind.)	Cormac Breathnach (FF)	3 seats from 1948 to 1969	
15th	1954	Declan Costello (FG)	Thomas Byrne (Ind.)	Richard Gogan (FF)	3 seats from 1948 to 1969	
16th	1957	Declan Costello (FG)	Thomas Byrne (Ind.)	Richard Gogan (FF)	3 seats from 1948 to 1969	
17th	1961	Declan Costello (FG)	Michael Mullen (Lab)	Richard Gogan (FF)	3 seats from 1948 to 1969	
18th	1965	Declan Costello (FG)	Michael Mullen (Lab)	Richard Gogan (FF)	3 seats from 1948 to 1969	
19th	1969	Hugh Byrne (FG)	Jim Tunney (FF)	Richard Gogan (FF)	David Thornley (Lab)	4 seats from 1969 to 1977
20th	1973	Hugh Byrne (FG)	Jim Tunney (FF)	Richard Gogan (FF)	David Thornley (Lab)	4 seats from 1969 to 1977
21st	1977	Constituency abolished. See Dublin Finglas and Dublin Cabra				

Dáil	Election	Deputy (Party)	Deputy (Party)	Deputy (Party)	Deputy (Party)
22nd	1981	Jim Tunney (FF)	Michael Barrett (FF)	Mary Flaherty (FG)	Hugh Byrne (FG)
23rd	1982 (Feb)	Jim Tunney (FF)	Michael Barrett (FF)	Mary Flaherty (FG)	Proinsias De Rossa (WP)
24th	1982 (Nov)	Jim Tunney (FF)	Michael Barrett (FF)	Mary Flaherty (FG)	Proinsias De Rossa (WP)
25th	1987	Jim Tunney (FF)	Michael Barrett (FF)	Mary Flaherty (FG)	Proinsias De Rossa (WP)
26th	1989	Jim Tunney (FF)	Michael Barrett (FF)	Mary Flaherty (FG)	Proinsias De Rossa (WP)
27th	1992	Noel Ahern (FF)	Róisín Shortall (Lab)	Mary Flaherty (FG)	Proinsias De Rossa (DL)
28th	1997	Noel Ahern (FF)	Róisín Shortall (Lab)	Pat Carey (FF)	Proinsias De Rossa (DL)
29th	2002	Noel Ahern (FF)	Róisín Shortall (Lab)	Pat Carey (FF)	3 seats from 2002
30th	2007	Noel Ahern (FF)	Róisín Shortall (Lab)	Pat Carey (FF)	3 seats from 2002
31st	2011	Dessie Ellis (SF)	Róisín Shortall (Lab)	John Lyons (Lab)	3 seats from 2002
32nd	2016	Dessie Ellis (SF)	Róisín Shortall (SD)	Noel Rock (FG)	3 seats from 2002
33rd	2020	Dessie Ellis (SF)	Róisín Shortall (SD)	Paul McAuliffe (FF)	3 seats from 2002
34th	2024	Dessie Ellis (SF)	Rory Hearne (SD)	Paul McAuliffe (FF)	3 seats from 2002
