= Philomena Canning =

Irish midwife (1959–2019)

- Born: 12 September 1959; Glenvar, County Donegal, Ireland
- Died: 22 March 2019 (aged 59); Dublin, Ireland
- Occupation: Midwife
- Known for: Advocacy for natural birth

Philomena Canning (19 September 1959 – 22 March 2019) was an Irish midwife and advocate for natural birth in Ireland and internationally. She advocated for the right for Irish women to give birth at home or in non-medical settings.

== Advocacy work ==
Philomena Canning was from Glenvar, County Donegal, and early in her career worked as a midwife in the Australian Outback and Saudi Arabia. She served as chair of an abortion advocacy group, Midwives for Choice in Ireland.

In 2014, Canning's indemnity licence was withdrawn without notice as the cases of two women had come to the attention of the Health Service Executive (HSE). Neither of the women had complained, and the action was taken weeks after she had submitted a detailed application to the HSE to open two home birth centres in Dublin. Her indemnity was restored in February 2015 but she was unable to practise until the HSE carried out a system analysis. She was eventually declared free to practice in 2016 but by then she said that her business and reputation had been gravely undermined by the delays and false accusations. The HSE offered her a settlement after she initiated a damages case but she pressed to have the case heard in court to expose what were described as "serious injustices" in her treatment. Further delays followed and she was diagnosed with ovarian cancer which then spread to her abdomen in 2018. She subsequently made a decision to settle the case as she was unable to afford to buy immunotherapy drugs to treat the terminal disease. Previously she had sold her house as she was unable to keep up mortgage repayment due to the ongoing issues affecting her work.

The case was the subject of a protest outside the Dáil Éireann in February 2019. In March 2019 the case was settled. In a statement, Canning said the settlement was a "relief". Canning died of ovarian cancer on 22 March 2019, while seeking treatment at St. Vincent's Private Hospital in Dublin.
