= Bronco McLoughlin =

Irish stuntman and actor (1938–2019)

- Born: Anthony McLoughlin; 10 August 1938; Curragh, County Kildare, Ireland
- Died: 26 March 2019 (aged 80); Ashford, County Wicklow, Ireland
- Occupations: Actor, stuntman
- Years active: 1967–2014

Anthony "Bronco" McLoughlin (10 August 1938 – 26 March 2019) was an Irish actor, stuntman, and animal trainer.

He performed and co-ordinated stunts in more than 40 movies, including being tied to the wooden cross that floats over the top of a waterfall in the opening scene of The Mission (1986). McLoughlin also had roles in Star Wars (1977), Superman (1978), the James Bond movie A View to a Kill (1985), Rambo III (1988), as a customs officer in Total Recall (1990), and an assassin in Gangs of New York (2002).

In the horror movie Hellbound: Hellraiser II (1988), because of a neck accident, Kenneth Cranham only wore the Channard Cenobite makeup for one day, and McLoughlin played the role for the rest of the shoot.

McLoughlin was an inductee into the Stuntmen's Hall of Fame.

He died in Ireland in March 2019.
