= Disappearance of Jón Jónsson =

Unsolved 2019 disappearance of Icelandic poker player in Dublin, Ireland

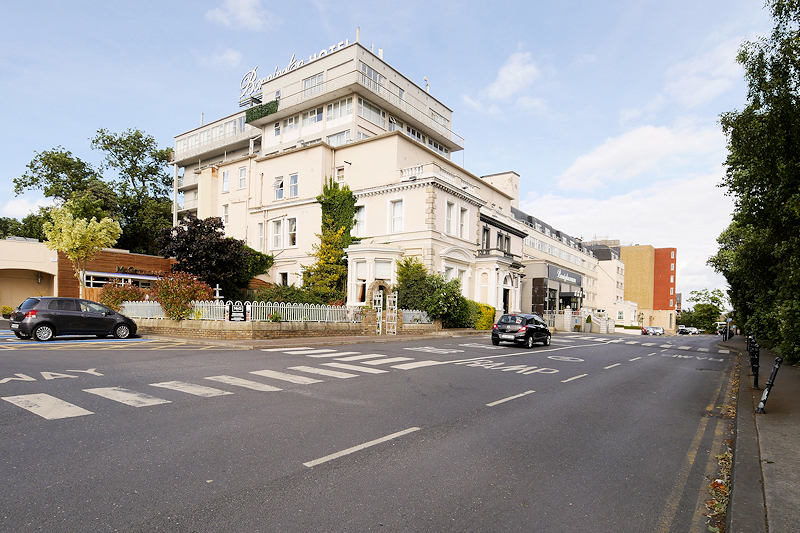
Bonnington Hotel, Dublin

Locations
1 Bonnington Hotel where Jón Jónsson was last seen in person.
2 Corner of Collins Avenue where Jón Jónsson was last seen on CCTV.

Jón Jónsson is an Icelandic man who disappeared on the morning of 9 February 2019 almost immediately after arriving into the capital city of Ireland to compete at the Dublin Poker Festival.

== Events and investigation ==
=== 2019 ===
Jónsson had a Bonnington Hotel key card with him at the time of his disappearance; he has not been seen since leaving his room in the hotel.

Closed-circuit television of Jón Jónsson was put out to the public on Crimecall. Another appeal by the Garda Síochána for Jón Jónsson's whereabouts was put out on 24 February, and a new photograph of Jónsson was put out on 8 April. Another appeal for Jón Jónsson's whereabouts was sent out on 24 June.

=== 2024 - 2025 ===
A renewed appeal was launched in February 2024, five years after Jónsson's disappearance. His brother and sister came to Dublin for the occasion.

In 2024, two cases of anonymous correspondence were brought to the notice of investigators. On 13 February, they searched Santry Demesne, "a public park with forestry and a lake", but the search of several days ended in disappointment.

Jónsson's disappearance was covered on the Crimecall episode of 26 February 2024 on RTÉ One. In early 2025, there was a joint RTÉ (Ireland) and RÚV (Iceland) six-part true crime podcast series. The series was done over 18 months.

Gardaí got Europol involved in March 2025. Gardaí, Europol and Icelandic investigators met in The Hague, Netherlands. Jón Jónsson's family landed into Dublin again, this time with his mother, and were on The Late Late Show with Patrick Kielty.
