= Frankie Kennedy (Gaelic footballer) =

Cavan Gaelic footballer (1941–2019)

Personal information
- Native name: Prionsias Ó Cinnéide (Irish)
- Nickname: Giles McConnell senior
- Born: 1941 Belturbet, County Cavan, Ireland
- Died: 21 December 2019 (aged 78) Cavan, County Cavan, Ireland

Sport
- Sport: Gaelic football
- Position: Right wing-back/left wing back
Club
- Years: Club
- Drumlane
Club titles
- Cavan titles: 0
- All-Ireland Titles: 0
Inter-county
- Years: County
- Cavan
Inter-county titles
- Ulster titles: 1
- All-Irelands: 0
- NFL: 0
- All Stars: 0

Francis Kennedy (1941 – 21 December 2019) was a Gaelic footballer who played for Cavan Championship club Drumlane and the Cavan county team, with whom he lined out at senior level as a left wing-back.

== Honours ==
Drumlane

- Cavan Junior Football Championship (1): 1971

Cavan

- Ulster Senior Football Championship (1): 1964
- Ulster Minor Football Championship (1): 1959
