= Lisa Smith (soldier) =

Former Irish soldier, convicted terrorist and convert to Islam (b. 1981)

- Born: c. 1981 (age 44–45); Dundalk, County Louth, Ireland
- Spouse(s): Claimed to have been married four times, including 'Ahmed' and Sajid Aslam
- Children: 1
- Military career
- Allegiance: Ireland (to 2011); Islamic State of Iraq and the Levant (2015 - 2019)
- Branches: Irish Army, Irish Air Corps
- Service years: c. 2000–2011
- Rank: Private (Irish Army), Airman (Irish Air Corps)
- Unit: 27 Infantry Battalion (Irish Army)
- Conflicts: Syrian civil war

Lisa Smith (born c. 1981) is a former Irish soldier who converted to Islam and later travelled to Syria during the Syrian Civil War becoming a terrorist to join the militant group the Islamic State of Iraq and the Levant (ISIS). Born in Dundalk, she was a member of the Irish Army before transferring to the Irish Air Corps in 2011, but quit following her conversion to Islam. In 2015, following the breakdown of her marriage, she travelled to Syria to join ISIS. In 2019, she was captured and detained by the US forces in northern Syria. She was sentenced at the Irish Special Criminal Court on 22 July 2022 to 15 months in prison following her conviction on 30 May of membership of ISIS.

A 2019 profile reported that Smith had probably travelled to Syria a few months after their 2011 interview with her, and was known to be in Syria in 2015. Irish security officials also told the Irish Independent that they consider Smith to have been no more than a sympathizer. Once in ISIS territory, she became the second wife of Sajid Aslam, a British jihadist. Aslam was still married to Lorna Moore, another Irish woman, who was in prison in the United Kingdom. Smith says she married Aslam as women were not allowed to live alone in ISIS territory. While there, Smith gave birth to a daughter.

She flew into Dublin on 1 December 2019, having been reportedly repatriated by members of the Army Ranger Wing from the Syrian border, where she was arrested upon arrival. She was charged on 4 December 2019 with foreign terrorist offences and membership of a terrorist group, and was released on bail. She denies being a member of the ISIS. Relatives assert that she had never been a member of ISIS and was just a sympathizer.

The charges against Smith include the allegation she was "a member of a terrorist group styling itself the Islamic State of Iraq and the Levant (ISIL) also known as Dawlat al-Iraq al-Islamiyya, Islamic State of Iraq (ISI), Islamic State of Iraq and Syria (ISIS) and Dawlat al Islamiya fi Iraq wa al Sham, otherwise known as 'Da'esh' and the Islamic State in Iraq and Sham". On 17 April 2020, her trial was adjourned, until 17 July 2020, due to the COVID-19 shutdowns. She was allowed to return to live with her child.

Smith's case was one profiled in a study by the International Center for the Study of Violent Extremism, as to whether individuals had been recruited to join ISIS solely through online coaching. Smith confirmed to her interviewers she had travelled to Daesh-occupied Syria solely due to the online recruiting of a seemingly reliable online mentor. Smith told interviewers she was concerned over ISIS brutality, which he assured her was just anti-Muslim propaganda.

In May 2021, she won an appeal against a ban on entry to the United Kingdom, ahead of her trial in January 2022.

On 30 May 2022, the Special Criminal Court sitting in Dublin convicted Smith of the offence of membership of an unlawful terrorist group ie ISIS; she was sentenced to 15 months in prison. Smith was found not guilty on a second charge of attempting to finance a terrorist organisation.

== See also ==
- Shamima Begum — a British-born woman who also went to Syria in 2015 to join the Islamic State and whose intent to return to the UK sparked a public debate about the repatriation of jihadists.
- Brides of ISIL
