= Murder of Vincent Parsons =

Crime in Ireland, August 2019

Coordinates: 53.28162°N 6.38431°W

Vincent Parsons was a welder and father of two from Clondalkin who was assaulted in Tallaght and died two days later. He and his wife Claire had a daughter and son.

== Assault ==
He was socialising with friends in the Killinarden House pub in Tallaght on 24 August 2019. On his way home, he was assaulted and found with head injuries on the roadside at Killinarden estate. He was taken to Tallaght Hospital where he died of his injuries on 26 August 2019.

== Reaction ==
The murder was condemned by local politicians. Louise Dunne, a local Sinn Féin councillor said that the local community was "devastated" by the murder". She also said, "There is just a huge community outcry over the violent death on our doorsteps". Independent local councillor Mick Duff said, "People just can’t believe it. There is no comprehension as to how this sort of thing can happen to a young man". He also said, "There’s no place for that kind of violence in our community. I sincerely hope that anyone with any leads will speak with officers in Tallaght Garda station so the perpetrators can be brought to justice." Charlie O'Connor, a Fianna Fáil representative for Tallaght Central said, "You hear about these things happening all over the country but when they happen right next door you are even more in shock. We are all just in deep upset".

== Aftermath ==
His funeral was held in the Church of the Transfiguration, Bawnogue.

In October 2019, two men were charged with his murder. There was no application for bail as it can only be granted by the High Court.

== Trial ==
The trial heard that Vincent Parsons had attended a stag party and had too much to drink and had become drunk. He started hugging people, some of whom became irritated. The two accused were also in the pub and became irritated. Disney pointed at and spoke to Parsons and had to be restrained. Following the incident, the prosecution said he ran from the pub "as if his life depended on it".

Parsons tried fleeing but didn't know the area. Carlyle and Disney followed in Carlyle's van. They caught him at the green on Kilinarden way. Parsons was hiding behind a bush and tried to flee, but the two men caught him and inflicted the fatal injuries in less than forty-eight seconds. Parsons died in hospital two days later in the presence of his family.

After the attack, the men drove to Carlyle's home, changed their clothing, then hid the van in a nearby housing estate. They returned to the pub 35 minutes later to create a false alibi that they had never left. Disney gave Gardaí clothes he had not worn the night of the attack, those he had were never found.

The killers were linked to the murder by a combination of CCTV, blood stains, hand injuries and other forensic evidence. Parson's watch was found in the van. It was a present from his daughter and bore the inscription "To Dad, love Jade, Xmas 2011".

=== Conviction ===
In December 2022, Philip Disney and Sean Carlyle were convicted of the murder of Vincent Parsons. The jury deliberated for four hours and forty-eight minutes over two days. The two men denied murdering him but were found guilty by a unanimous jury.

=== Sentencing ===
In January 2023, the men were sentenced to life.

The judge said the victim was subjected to a short extremely violent assault that was not spontaneous. The judge said, "Nothing explains what motivated him to flee and them to pursue and murder him" and that "Both (Disney and Carlyle) were composed and fully in control of their decisions. Mr Parsons was subjected to a pitiless beating, he offered no resistance and was left for dead".

Neither man showed remorse during the sentencing but smiled and winked instead. Carlyle shouted abuse at the family of the deceased as the men were led away.
