= Barbara Wright (professor) =

Irish academic

- Born: 8 March 1935
- Died: 14 December 2019 (aged 84)
- Occupation: Professor

Academic background
- Education: Trinity College Dublin; University of Cambridge

Academic work
- Discipline: French studies

Barbara Wright (née Robinson, 8 March 1935 – 14 December 2019), Emerita Professor of French at Trinity College, Dublin, was an Irish translator, notably of Eugène Fromentin, Charles Baudelaire and Gustave Moreau, as well as other nineteenth-century French writers, philosophers and artists.

== Education and career ==
The only child of William Edward Robinson and Rosaleen née Hoskin, she grew up in Terenure, County Dublin, and attended Alexandra College before reading Law and French at TCD, graduating LLB in 1956, proceeding MA in 1960. She pursued further studies in French literature at Newnham College, Cambridge, taking a PhD in 1962.

Married to Professor Bill Wright in 1961, she lectured at the Universities of Manchester and Exeter, before returning to Trinity College, Dublin in 1965. She became one of the first four women to be elected a Fellow of TCD in 1968, later serving as Dean of the Faculty of Arts and a Senior Fellow.

Wright was a world expert on Eugène Fromentin and published extensively on his literature and paintings, as well as exploring connections through literary correspondence of the era.

== Honours and awards ==
=== Honours ===
- Officier, ordre national du Mérite (2004)
  - Chevalier, ordre national du Mérite (1975)
- Chevalier, Légion d'honneur (2019)
- Croix pro Merito Melitensi.

=== Academic awards ===
Elected a Fellow of the Royal Irish Academy and the Academia Europæa, Wright received Hon LittD (TCD) in 1995 and Honorary Fellowship of the Royal Irish Academy of Music in 2012.
