= Robert Elgie (academic) =

Professor

Robert Clyde Elgie (23 April 1965 – 14 July 2019) was a professor at Dublin City University and Member of the Royal Irish Academy. His work mainly related to the study of semi-presidential systems and he also specialised in French Politics. Professor Elgie was founding head of the School of Law and Government at Dublin City University.

He received his Doctor of Philosophy from the London School of Economics in 1992 with a thesis on "The influence of the French Prime Minister in the policy making process 1981-1991." From Nottingham, he received a county scholarship to Nottingham High School and played for the under 19s Nottinghamshire cricket team. He received an exhibition scholarship to Oriel College Oxford.

He married Etain Tannam in 1992 whom he met at LSE and they had 2 sons. He died in July 2019.

== Published works ==
Books by Robert Elgie include:

- Semi-presidentialism: Subtypes and Democratic Performance. Oxford University Press 2011
- Political Institutions in Contemporary France, Oxford University Press, 2003.
- Divided Government in Comparative Perspective, Oxford University Press, 2001.
- French Politics: Debates and Controversies, Routledge, 2000.
- The Changing French Political System, Frank Cass, 2000.
- Semi-presidentialism in Europe, Oxford University Press, 1999. According to WorldCat, the book is held in 270 libraries
- The Politics of Central Banks, (with Helen Thompson) Routledge, 1998.
- Electing the French President. The 1995 Presidential Election, Macmillan, 1996.
- Political Leadership in Liberal Democracies, Macmillan, 1995.
- The Role of the Prime Minister in France, 1981-1991, Macmillan, 1993. According to WorldCat, the book is held in 250 libraries
